= Fidel de Luca =

Argentine golfer

Personal information
- Nationality: Argentina
- Born: 29 April 1922 San Isidro, Buenos Aires, Argentina
- Died: 6 June 2007 (aged 85) San Isidro, Buenos Aires, Argentina

Career
- Sport: Golf
- Turned professional: 1948
- Professional wins: 51

Best results in major championships
- Masters Tournament: CUT: 1962
- PGA Championship: DNP
- U.S. Open: DNP
- The Open Championship: T16: 1960

Fidel de Luca (29 April 1922 – 6 June 2007) was an Argentine professional golfer.

== Career ==
De Luca was born on 29 April 1922 in San Isidro, Buenos Aires. He worked as a caddie in Buenos Aires before turning professional in 1948.

De Luca won the Argentine Professional Ranking nine times, but only competed in three major championships, appearing twice in the British Open, in 1958 and 1960, and once in the Masters Tournament in 1962. In 1958, on the European circuit, he won the German Open, and finished fourth in French Open.

De Luca represented Argentina on nine occasions in the World Cup, with a best finish of second place in partnership with Roberto De Vicenzo in the 1962 edition, which was held on home soil at the Jockey Club in Buenos Aires.

== Professional wins (51) ==
=== European wins (1) ===
- 1958 German Open

=== Argentine wins (43) ===
- 1952 Alvear Grand Prix
- 1954 Argentine Open
- 1956 Argentino Grand Prix, Western Textil Grand Prix (tie with Romulado Barbieri and Antonio Cerdá)
- 1957 Olivos Grand Prix
- 1958 Center Open
- 1959 Abierto del Litoral, Rio Cuarto Open
- 1960 Argentine Open, Abierto del Litoral
- 1961 Argentine Open, Abierto del Litoral, Acantilados Grand Prix
- 1962 Argentine PGA Championship, Abierto del Litoral
- 1963 Argentine PGA Championship, South Open
- 1964 Juan Dentone Cup
- 1965 North Open
- 1966 Abierto del Litoral
- 1967 Juan Dentone Cup
- 1968 Center Open, Argentine PGA Championship, La Cumbre Open
- 1969 Abierto del Litoral
- 1970 Jockey Club Rosario Open, Metropolitano Open
- 1971 Abierto del Litoral, North Open, Jujuy Open, Chaco Open
- 1972 Argentine Open, Norpatagonico Open, Ituzaingo Grand Prix, San Martin Grand Prix
- 1973 Argentine PGA Championship, Jujuy Open
- 1974 South Open, Abierto del Litoral, Ituzaingo Grand Prix
- 1976 Mendoza Open, Jockey Club Rosario Open
- 1982 Argentine PGA Championship

=== Other wins (7) ===
- 1955 Peru Open
- 1956 Brazil Open
- 1965 Ecuador Open
- 1970 Petropolis Open (Brazil)
- 1974 Peru Open
- 1979 Brazil Open
- 1990 Argentine Senior PGA Championship

== Team appearances ==
- World Cup (representing Argentina): 1958, 1959, 1960, 1961, 1962, 1963, 1967, 1973, 1974
