= Marcos Churio =

Argentine golfer

Personal information
- Nationality: Argentina
- Born: 4 October 1900 Mar del Plata

Career
- Sport: Golf
- Turned professional: 1920
- Professional wins: 18

Best results in major championships
- Masters Tournament: DNP
- PGA Championship: DNP
- U.S. Open: DNP
- The Open Championship: T7: 1931

Marcos Churio (born 4 October 1900) was an Argentine professional golfer.

Churio was born in Mar del Plata. He turned professional in 1920, and competed in Europe between 1931 and 1939, where his best tournament finish was 5th place in the 1931 Southport Open in England. That year, he was 7th in the British Open at Carnoustie.

Churio's brother, Pedro, won several tournaments in Argentina and later designed many golf courses. His nephew, Martin Pose, won the French Open in 1939.

Churio won the Argentine Open in three decades, in 1926, 1934 and 1943. He also finished runner-up on six occasions, in 1928, 1929, 1932, 1935, 1936 and 1937.

== Professional wins ==
=== Argentine wins (16) ===
- 1925 Buenos Aires Professional Tournament
- 1926 Argentine PGA Championship, Argentine Open
- 1928 South Open
- 1929 South Open
- 1930 Argentine PGA Championship
- 1931 South Open, Center Open, Argentine PGA Championship
- 1932 Abierto del Litoral, Argentine PGA Championship
- 1934 Argentine Open
- 1941 Abierto del Litoral, Mendoza Open
- 1942 South Open
- 1943 Argentine Open

=== Other wins (2) ===
- 1926 Uruguay Open
- 1939 Uruguay Open

== Team appearances ==
- Great Britain–Argentina Professional Match (representing Argentina): 1939
