= 1956 Open Championship =

1956 golf tournament held at the Royal Liverpool Golf Club, Hoylake, Wirral, England

Coordinates: 53.385°N 3.190°W

Tournament information
- Dates: 4–6 July 1956
- Location: Hoylake, England
- Course: Royal Liverpool Golf Club

Statistics
- Par: 71
- Length: 6,960 yards (6,364 m)
- Field: 96 players, 49 after cut
- Cut: 153 (+11)
- Prize fund: £3,750 $10,500
- Winner's share: £1,000 $2,800

Champion
- (Australia) Peter Thomson
- 286 (+2)

Location in England

The 1956 Open Championship was the 85th Open Championship, held 4–6 July at Royal Liverpool Golf Club in Hoylake, England. Two-time defending champion Peter Thomson of Australia won his third consecutive Open, three strokes ahead of runner-up Flory Van Donck of Belgium. It was the third of five Open titles for the 26-year-old Thomson.

Qualifying took place on 2–3 July. Entries played 18 holes on the Championship course and 18 holes at Wallasey. With a record 360 entries it was decided that, for the first time, qualifying would be in groups of three rather than the usual two. The number of qualifiers was limited to a maximum of 100. Ties for 100th place would not qualify. The qualifying score was 152 and 96 players qualified. Gary Player and Peter Thomson led the qualifiers on 140. The maximum number of players making the cut after 36 holes was set at 50. Ties for 50th place did not make the cut. Prize money was unchanged with £1,000 for the winner out of a total purse of £3,750.

== Round summaries ==
=== First round ===
Wednesday, 4 July 1956

Place	Player	Score	To par
1	(Wales) Dennis Smalldon	68	−3
2	(Argentina) Enrique Bertolino	69	−2
T3	(Canada) Al Balding	70	−1
T3	(England) Eric Lester	70	−1
T3	(Wales) Dave Thomas	70	−1
T3	(Australia) Peter Thomson	70	−1
T7	(Spain) Carlos Celles	71	E
T7	(Argentina) Roberto De Vicenzo	71	E
T7	(Spain) Ángel Miguel	71	E
T7	(South Africa) Gary Player	71	E
T7	(Belgium) Flory Van Donck	71	E

=== Second round ===
Thursday, 5 July 1956

Place	Player	Score	To par
1	(Australia) Peter Thomson	70-70=140	−2
T2	(Argentina) Enrique Bertolino	69-72=141	−1
T2	(Argentina) Roberto De Vicenzo	71-70=141	−1
T4	(Spain) Ángel Miguel	71-74=145	+3
T4	(Belgium) Flory Van Donck	71-74=145	+3
6	(England) Eric Lester	70-76=146	+4
T7	(South Africa) Gary Player	71-76=147	+5
T7	(Wales) Dennis Smalldon	68-79=147	+5
T9	(England) Henry Cotton	72-76=148	+6
T9	(England) Bernard Hunt	75-73=148	+6
T9	(United States) Mike Souchak	74-74=148	+6
T9	(United States) Frank Stranahan	72-76=148	+6
T9	(Wales) Dave Thomas	70-78=148	+6
T9	(England) Charlie Ward	73-75=148	+6
T9	(England) Harry Weetman	72-76=148	+6

Amateurs: Carr (+8), Sharp (+12), Jones (+12), Tate (+14), Shepperson (+17), Thirlwell (+18), Fogarty (+21).

=== Third round ===
Friday, 6 July 1956 - (morning)

Place	Player	Score	To par
1	(Australia) Peter Thomson	70-70-72=212	−1
2	(Belgium) Flory Van Donck	71-74-70=215	+2
3	(Argentina) Enrique Bertolino	69-72-76=217	+4
4	(England) Henry Cotton	72-76-71=219	+6
T5	(Argentina) Roberto De Vicenzo	71-70-79=220	+7
T5	(Spain) Ángel Miguel	71-74-75=220	+7
T5	(South Africa) Gary Player	71-76-73=220	+7
T5	(United States) Frank Stranahan	72-76-72=220	+7
9	(Argentina) Antonio Cerdá	72-81-68=221	+8
T10	(Scotland) John Panton	74-76-72=222	+9
T10	(United States) Mike Souchak	74-74-74=222	+9

=== Final round ===
Friday, 6 July 1956 - (afternoon)

Place	Player	Score	To par	Money (£)
1	(Australia) Peter Thomson	70-70-72-74=286	+2	1,000
2	(Belgium) Flory Van Donck	71-74-70-74=289	+5	500
3	(Argentina) Roberto De Vicenzo	71-70-79-70=290	+6	350
4	(South Africa) Gary Player	71-76-73-71=291	+7	200
5	(Scotland) John Panton	74-76-72-70=292	+8	150
T6	(Argentina) Enrique Bertolino	69-72-76-76=293	+9	87
T6	(England) Henry Cotton	72-76-71-74=293	+9	87
T8	(Argentina) Antonio Cerdá	72-81-68-73=294	+10	62
T8	(United States) Mike Souchak	74-74-74-72=294	+10	62
T10	(Republic of Ireland) Christy O'Connor Snr	73-78-74-70=295	+11	40
T10	(England) Harry Weetman	72-76-75-72=295	+11	40

Amateur: Carr (+22).
