= Leopoldo Ruiz =

Argentine golfer

Personal information
- Full name: Leopoldo Ismael Ruiz
- Nickname: Cacho
- Nationality: Argentina
- Born: 7 August 1926 Buenos Aires, Argentina
- Died: 10 May 1986 (aged 59) Buenos Aires

Career
- Sport: Golf
- Turned professional: 1951
- Professional wins: 30

Best results in major championships
- Masters Tournament: CUT: 1962, 1965
- PGA Championship: DNP
- U.S. Open: DNP
- The Open Championship: T5: 1958

Leopoldo Ruiz (7 August 1926 – 10 May 1986) is an Argentine professional golfer. He tied for fifth place in the 1958 Open Championship and tied for ninth the following year. He represented Argentina eight times in the World Cup.

== Early life ==
In 1926, Ruiz was Born in Buenos Aires. Early in his career, he worked as a caddie in Buenos Aires.

== Professional career ==
In 1951, Ruiz turned professional. During his career, Ruiz won the Argentine Professional Ranking four times, and competed in seven major championships, appearing five times in The Open Championship, from 1958 to 1961 and 1968, and twice in the Masters Tournament in 1962 and 1965. In 1958, he missed out on being in a playoff for the Open title, when he had a triple bogey at the last hole at Royal Lytham & St Annes to finish tied for 5th place, three strokes off the leaders. A year later, at Muirfield, he finished in a tie for 9th.

In 1960, on the European circuit, Ruiz was second in the French Open, and a year later finished fourth in the German Open. He had most success in South America, where he won the Argentine Open in 1957 and 1959, the Colombian Open and the Uruguay Open in 1958, and the Argentine PGA Championship on six occasions, in addition to many other regional opens. He was also second in the Brazil Open in 1957 and 1958, the Argentine Open in 1960 and 1973, and the Colombian Open in 1972.

Ruiz represented Argentina in the World Cup on eight occasions between 1957 and 1969, and was runner up in the team competition alongside Roberto De Vicenzo in 1964.

== Professional wins ==
=== Argentine wins (27) ===
- 1953 Argentine PGA Championship
- 1956 Argentine PGA Championship
- 1957 Argentine Open, Abierto del Litoral, South Open
- 1958 Argentine PGA Championship, Abierto del Litoral
- 1959 Argentine Open, Metropolitan Championship
- 1960 Center Open
- 1961 Argentine PGA Championship, Center Open
- 1963 Argentine Masters, North Open
- 1964 Center Open, Rio Cuarto Open
- 1965 Argentine Masters, Metropolitan Championship
- 1966 South Open, Center Open, Rio Cuarto Open
- 1967 Argentine PGA Championship, Abierto del Litoral
- 1968 Jockey Club Rosario Open
- 1970 South Open
- 1972 Jujuy Open
- 1975 Argentine PGA Championship

=== Other wins (3) ===
- 1958 Colombian Open, Uruguay Open
- 1968 Los Leones Open (Chile)

== Results in major championships ==
Tournament	1958	1959	1960	1961	1962	1963	1964	1965	1966	1967	1968
Masters Tournament					CUT			CUT			
The Open Championship	T5	T9	T32	CUT							CUT

Note: Ruiz never played in the U.S. Open nor the PGA Championship.

Top 10
Did not play

CUT = missed the halfway cut (3rd round cut in 1968 Open Championship)
"T" = tied

== Team appearances ==
- World Cup (representing Argentina): 1957, 1958, 1959, 1960, 1961, 1964, 1966, 1969
