= Coast Open =

Golf tournament in Argentina

Abierto del Litoral
Tournament information
- Location: Rosario, Santa Fe, Argentina
- Established: 1932
- Course: Rosario Golf Club
- Par: 70
- Tours: Challenge Tour; Tour de las Américas; TPG Tour; PGA of Argentina Tour
- Format: Stroke play
- Prize fund: AR$36,000,000
- Month played: December

Tournament record score
- Aggregate: 258 Alejandro Tosti (2024)
- To par: −26 as above

Current champion
- (Argentina) Fabián Gómez

Final champion
- Location in Argentina

The Coast Open, or Abierto del Litoral, is a golf tournament played in Argentina. Founded in 1932 as the Torneo de Profesionales (Professional Tournament), a name only used for the first two editions, it has always been played at the Rosario Golf Club in Rosario, Santa Fe.

The tournament has been a fixture on the PGA Tour Latinoamérica Developmental Series. It was previously an annual stop on the higher level Tour de las Américas from 2000 until 2010 having been an event on that tours predecessor, the South American Tour, between 1993 and 1999. It was also included on the European Challenge Tour schedule in 2007 (2008 season), being one of five tournaments held in Latin America, and four in Argentina, that season.

Fidel de Luca has the most victories, with eight. In 1932, 1952 and 1983 the championship ended in a tie, with no playoff being held to determine an outright winner.

== Winners ==
Year	Tour(s) (Note: ARG − PGA of Argentina Tour; CHA − Challenge Tour; TLA − Tour de las Américas; TPG − TPG Tour.)	Winner	Score	To par	Margin of victory	Runner(s)-up
Abierto del Litoral
2025	TPG	(Argentina) Fabián Gómez	262	−22	5 strokes	(Argentina) Ricardo González
2024	TPG	(Argentina) Alejandro Tosti (2)	258	−26	6 strokes	(Argentina) Augusto Núñez
2023	TPG	(Argentina) Joaquín Ludueña (a)	264	−20	Playoff	(Argentina) Alejandro Tosti
2022	TPG	(Argentina) Alejandro Tosti	268	−12	1 stroke	(Argentina) Nelson Ledesma
2021	TPG	(Argentina) Martín Contini	269	−15	2 strokes	(Argentina) Andrés Gallegos (Argentina) Fabián Gómez
2020: No tournament
2019	TPG	(Argentina) César Costilla	271	−9	2 strokes	(Argentina) César Monasterio
2018		(Argentina) Vicente Marzilio (a)	280	E	2 strokes	(Argentina) Andrés Schönbaum (a)
2017	TPG	(Argentina) Sebastián Bergagna	266	−14	6 strokes	(Argentina) Sebastián Saavedra
2016	TPG	(Argentina) Thomas Baik	272	−8	Playoff	(Argentina) César Costilla
2015	TPG	(Argentina) Rafael Gómez	268	−12	2 strokes	(Argentina) Julián Etulain
2014	TPG	(Argentina) Miguel Ángel Carballo	269	−11	1 stroke	(Argentina) Jorge Monroy (Argentina) Julio Zapata
2013	TPG	(Argentina) Ricardo González (5)	268	−12	4 strokes	(Argentina) Sergio Acevedo
2012	TPG	(Argentina) Santiago Bauni (a)	272	−8	1 stroke	(Paraguay) Marco Ruiz
2011: No tournament
2010	TPG	(Argentina) Ricardo González (4)	273	−7	3 strokes	(Argentina) Rafael Gómez (Argentina) Mauricio Molina
2009	TPG	(Argentina) Ricardo González (3)	277	−3	Playoff	(Argentina) Andrés Romero
2008	TLA, TPG	(Argentina) Andrés Romero (2)	268	−12	3 strokes	(Argentina) Mauricio Molina
Abierto del Litoral Personal
2007	CHA, TLA, TPG	(Argentina) Miguel Rodríguez	271	−9	1 stroke	(Argentina) Andrés Romero
Abierto del Litoral
2006	ARG, TLA	(Argentina) Andrés Romero	261	−19	7 strokes	(Argentina) Ricardo González
2005	ARG	(Argentina) Ricardo González (2)	204			(Argentina) Julio Zapata
2004: No tournament
2003		(Argentina) Ricardo González	267			(Argentina) Eduardo Romero
2002		(Argentina) Rodolfo González	282			(Argentina) José Cantero
2001	TLA	(Paraguay) Marco Ruiz	278	−6	Playoff	(Argentina) Gustavo Acosta (Argentina) Ariel Cañete (Argentina) Rafael Gómez (Argentina) Rodolfo González
2000	TLA	(Colombia) Jesús Amaya	134 (Note: Shortened to 36 holes due to rain.)	−10	Playoff	(Argentina) Gustavo Rojas
1999		(Argentina) César Monasterio (2)	275			(Argentina) Omar Solis (Argentina) Rigoberto Velazquez
1998		(United States) Tim Hegna	272			(Argentina) Armando Saavedra
1997		(Argentina) Armando Saavedra	266			(Canada) David Morland IV
1996		(United States) Scott Dunlap	266			(Namibia) Trevor Dodds (Paraguay) Pedro Martínez (Argentina) Rodolfo Rodríguez
1995		(Argentina) Ángel Cabrera	266			(Argentina) Miguel Fernández (Argentina) Gustavo Piovano
1994		(Argentina) César Monasterio	271			(United States) Brad Klapprott (Argentina) Gustavo Rojas
1993		(Argentina) Luis Carbonetti				(Argentina) Miguel Guzmán (Argentina) Ricardo Montenegro
1992		(Argentina) Adan Sowa (3)				(Argentina) Luis Carbonetti
1991		(Argentina) Jorge Berendt				
1990		(Argentina) Miguel Guzmán				
1989		(Argentina) Jorge Berendt				
1988		(Argentina) Miguel Fernández (2)				
1987		(Argentina) Miguel Fernández	279			(Argentina) Antonio Ortiz
1986		(Argentina) Armando Saavedra (2)	276			(Argentina) Vicente Fernández
1985		(Argentina) Armando Saavedra	275			(Argentina) Jorge Soto
1984		(Argentina) Eduardo Romero				
1983		(Argentina) Jorge Soto (Argentina) Adan Sowa (2)	278			
1982		(Argentina) Adan Sowa				
1981: No tournament
1980		(Argentina) Vicente Fernández (4)				
1979: No tournament
1978		(Argentina) Vicente Fernández (3)	282			(Argentina) Adan Sowa
1977		(Argentina) Florentino Molina (2)				(Argentina) Juan Carlos Cabrera
1976		(Argentina) Juan Carlos Molina				(Argentina) Jorge Soto
1975		(Argentina) Florentino Molina	282			
1974		(Argentina) Fidel de Luca (8)	279			(Argentina) Armando Saavedra
1973		(Argentina) Juan Monroy	280			(Argentina) Fidel de Luca (Argentina) Roberto De Vicenzo
1972		(Argentina) Vicente Fernández (2)	279			
1971		(Argentina) Fidel de Luca (7)	279			
1970		(Argentina) Vicente Fernández	289			
1969		(Argentina) Fidel de Luca (6)	283			
1968		(Argentina) Roberto De Vicenzo (5)	278			
1967		(Argentina) Leopoldo Ruiz (3)	219			
1966		(Argentina) Fidel de Luca (5)	280			
1965		(Argentina) Rodolfo Sereda	284			(Argentina) Roberto De Vicenzo
1964		(Argentina) Romualdo Barbieri (3)	292			
1963		(Argentina) Elcido Nari	293			
1962		(Argentina) Fidel de Luca (4)	282			
1961		(Argentina) Fidel de Luca (3)	288			
1960		(Argentina) Fidel de Luca (2)	281			
1959		(Argentina) Fidel de Luca	297			
1958		(Argentina) Leopoldo Ruiz (2)	286			
1957		(Argentina) Leopoldo Ruiz	289			
1956		(Argentina) Orlando Tudino	296			
1955		(Argentina) Arturo Soto (3)	293			
1954		(Argentina) Sebastian Nicolosi	294			
1953		(Argentina) Enrique Bertolino (2)	287			(Argentina) Arturo Soto
1952		(Argentina) J. C. Posse (Argentina) Arturo Soto (2)	294			
1951		(Argentina) Juan Anzaldo	287			(Argentina) Roberto De Vicenzo
1950		(Argentina) Romualdo Barbieri (2)	278			(Argentina) Juan Segura (a)
1949		(Argentina) Roberto De Vicenzo (4)	286			
1948		(Argentina) Romualdo Barbieri	283			
1947		(Argentina) Roberto De Vicenzo (3)	282			(Argentina) Arturo Soto
1946		(Argentina) Roberto De Vicenzo (2)	283			
1945		(Argentina) Martin Pose (3)	282			
1944		(Argentina) Arturo Soto	290			
1943		(Argentina) Enrique Bertolino	293			
1942		(Argentina) Roberto De Vicenzo	277			(Argentina) José Jurado
1941		(Argentina) Marcos Churio	282			
1940		(Argentina) Martin Pose (2)	292			
1939		(Argentina) Emilio Serra (3)	291			
1938		(Argentina) Emilio Serra (2)	291			
1937		(Argentina) Martin Pose	292			
1935–36: No tournament
1934		(Argentina) Emilio Serra	283			
1933: No tournament
1932		(Argentina) Marcos Churio (Argentina) Andres Perez	288			
