= Brazil Open (golf) =

Annual golf tournament

ECP Brazil Open
Tournament information
- Location: Rio de Janeiro, Brazil
- Established: 1945
- Course: Olympic Golf Course
- Par: 71
- Length: 7,126 yards (6,516 m)
- Tours: PGA Tour Americas; PGA Tour Latinoamérica; Tour de las Américas
- Format: Stroke play
- Prize fund: US$225,000
- Month played: April

Tournament record score
- Aggregate: 262 Rafael Becker (2014); 262 Mason Greene (2026)
- To par: −22 Mason Greene (2026)

Current champion
- (United States) Mason Greene

Location map
- Location in Brazil

The Brazil Open or Aberto do Brasil is an annual golf tournament held in Brazil. It was founded in 1945 and was an event on the Tour de las Américas on several occasions, most recently in 2005. It is now an event on PGA Tour Americas.

== History ==
Until the early 1980s the tournament was a famous stop for many of the world's top professionals. It can boast major winners Sam Snead, Billy Casper, Gary Player, Raymond Floyd, Jerry Pate and Hale Irwin in addition to superstars of South American golf, Roberto De Vicenzo and Ángel Cabrera, amongst its list of champions.

The most successful player remains Mário Gonzalez, who won a total of eight titles, including seven out of nine between 1946 and 1955 (no tournament was held in 1947).

As part of the celebrations of the 500 year anniversary of the discovery of Brazil by Pedro Álvares Cabral, in 2000 the European Tour included the São Paulo and the Rio de Janeiro 500 Year Opens on their schedule. The following year the São Paulo event was again included on the European calendar, and somewhat confusingly titled the São Paulo Brazil Open.

== Winners ==
Year	Tour (Note: PGATAM − PGA Tour Americas; PGATLA − PGA Tour Latinoamérica; TLA − Tour de las Américas.)	Winner	Score	To par	Margin of victory	Runner(s)-up	Venue	Ref.
ECP Brazil Open
2026	PGATAM	(United States) Mason Greene	262	−22	2 strokes	(United States) Brett Roberts	Campo Olímpico	
2025	PGATAM	(United States) Maxwell Moldovan	266	−18	1 stroke	(United States) George Markham	Campo Olímpico	
2024	PGATAM	(Canada) Matthew Anderson	197 (Note: Shortened to 54 holes due to weather.)	−16	1 stroke	(United States) Conner Godsey (United States) Ollie Osborne	Campo Olímpico	
JHSF Aberto do Brasil
2023	PGATLA	(New Zealand) Charlie Hillier	265	−19	1 stroke	(United States) Davis Shore	Fazenda Boa Vista	
2022	PGATLA	(Argentina) Jaime López Rivarola	264	−20	1 stroke	(Netherlands) Rowin Caron	Fazenda Boa Vista	
2020–21: No tournament
2019	PGATLA	(United States) Shad Tuten	263	−21	2 strokes	(United States) Patrick Flavin (United States) Patrick Newcomb	Fazenda Boa Vista	
2018	PGATLA	(Colombia) Marcelo Rozo	264	−20	1 stroke	(Australia) Harrison Endycott (United States) Chase Hanna	Fazenda Boa Vista	
Aberto do Brasil
2017	PGATLA	(Mexico) Rodolfo Cazaubón	267	−17	6 strokes	(Mexico) Óscar Fraustro (Mexico) José de Jesús Rodríguez	Campo Olímpico	
2016	PGATLA	(Argentina) Jorge Fernández-Valdés	280	−4	2 strokes	(Canada) Corey Conners (United States) Brad Hopfinger (Chile) Mito Pereira	Campo Olímpico	
2015	PGATLA	(Brazil) Alexandre Rocha	267	−17	Playoff	(United States) Kent Bulle (United States) Keith Mitchell	Itanhangá	
2014	PGATLA	(Brazil) Rafael Becker	262	−14	3 strokes	(Argentina) Ariel Cañete (United States) Joel Dahmen	Gavea	
2013	PGATLA	(United States) Ryan Blaum	265	−11	Playoff	(Argentina) Alan Wagner	Gavea	
2012	PGATLA	(Argentina) Clodomiro Carranza	269	−15	Playoff	(Mexico) José de Jesús Rodríguez	São Fernando	
2011	TLA	(Colombia) Óscar David Álvarez	275	−9	1 stroke	(Argentina) César Costilla (Argentina) Sebastián Fernández	São Fernando	
HSBC Aberto do Brasil
2010		(Paraguay) Marco Ruiz	269	−19	3 strokes	(Brazil) Felipe Navarro (a)	Alphaville Graciosa	
2009: No tournament
HSBC Premier Aberto do Brasil
2008		(Brazil) Rafael Barcellos	280			(Brazil) Alessandro Fabietti	Damha	
2006–07: No tournament
MasterCard Brazil Open
2005	TLA	(Argentina) Miguel Guzmán	275	−13	7 strokes	(Argentina) Eduardo Argiró (Argentina) Mauricio Molina	Costa do Sauípe	
Trump Aberto do Brasil
2004		(Brazil) Philippe Gasnier	278	−10	2 strokes	(Brazil) Rafael Barcellos	Costa do Sauípe	
American Express Trump Brazil Open
2003	TLA	(Paraguay) Carlos Franco (2)	281	−3	Playoff	(Argentina) Eduardo Argiró	São Fernando	
2002: No tournament
Chevrolet Brazil Open
2001	TLA	(Paraguay) Carlos Franco	273	−11	4 strokes	(Argentina) Miguel Guzmán	São Paulo	
2000	TLA	(Colombia) Jesús Amaya	274	−6	Playoff	(United States) Shannon Sykora	Guarapiranga	
Brazil Open
1999		(Argentina) Ángel Cabrera (2)	267	−17	Playoff	(Argentina) Eduardo Romero	São Paulo	
1998		(Argentina) Ángel Cabrera	265	−19	7 strokes	(Argentina) Eduardo Romero	São Paulo	
1997: No tournament
1996		(Brazil) Ruberlei Felizardo					Clube Curitibano	
1995		(Brazil) Eduardo Pesenti (a)	273		6 strokes	(Brazil) Ruberlei Felizardo	São Paulo	
1994: No tournament
1993		(Brazil) Eduardo Caballero (2)					São Paulo	
1992		(Brazil) Ricardo Mechereffe					Clube Curitibano	
1991		(Paraguay) Ángel Franco	279	−9	1 stroke	(Paraguay) Raúl Fretes	Itanhangá	
1990		(Paraguay) Pedro Martínez	271	−17	5 strokes	(Paraguay) Carlos Franco	São Paulo	
1989: No tournament
1988		(Venezuela) Carlos Larraín (a)	266	−6	4 strokes	(Argentina) Vicente Fernández (Paraguay) Pedro Martínez	Gavea	
1987: No tournament
1986		(Brazil) Eduardo Caballero	277	−7	2 strokes	(England) Phil Harrison	São Fernando	
1985		(England) Robert Lee	272	E	1 stroke	(Argentina) Horacio Carbonetti (Spain) Miguel Ángel Martín (Northern Ireland) Ronan Rafferty (Argentina) Eduardo Romero (Argentina) Adan Sowa	Gavea	
1984		(Argentina) Vicente Fernández (3)	277	−11	4 strokes	(United States) Jeff Hart	Itanhangá	
1983		(Argentina) Vicente Fernández (2)	275	−9	1 stroke	(England) Mark James	São Paulo	
1982		(United States) Hale Irwin	265	−7	2 strokes	(Spain) Manuel Calero (United States) Curtis Strange	Gavea	
1981		(United States) Tom Sieckmann	284	−4	1 stroke	(Brazil) Jaime Gonzalez	Itanhangá	
1980		(United States) Jerry Pate	274	−10	Playoff	(Spain) Manuel Piñero	São Fernando	
1979		(Argentina) Fidel de Luca	270	−2	Playoff	(Argentina) Roberto De Vicenzo	Gavea	
1978		(United States) Raymond Floyd	277	−7	5 strokes	(Argentina) Vicente Fernández (Scotland) Steve Martin	São Paulo	
1977		(Argentina) Vicente Fernández	274	−10	3 strokes	(United States) Lou Graham (Spain) Manuel Piñero	São Paulo	
1976		(Argentina) Juan Quinteros	279	−1	Playoff	(Argentina) Roberto De Vicenzo	Porto Alegre	
1975		(Brazil) Priscillo Diniz (a)	274	−10	Playoff	(United States) Lanny Wadkins	São Paulo	
1974		(South Africa) Gary Player (2)	267	−9	5 strokes	(United States) Mark Hayes	Gavea	
1973		(Argentina) Roberto De Vicenzo (6)	279	−1	4 strokes	(South Africa) Dale Hayes	São Fernando	
1972		(South Africa) Gary Player	270	−6	10 strokes	(United States) Steve Melnyk	Gavea	
1971		(United States) Bruce Fleisher	280	−4	Playoff	(Brazil) Jaime Gonzalez (a)	Itanhangá	
1970		(United States) Bert Greene	276	−8	4 strokes	(Argentina) Roberto De Vicenzo (Argentina) Florentino Molina (Australia) Bob Stanton	São Paulo	
1969		(Brazil) Mário Gonzalez (8)	280	E	1 stroke	(Argentina) Roberto De Vicenzo	Porto Alegre	
1968		(Japan) Takaaki Kono	282	+2	5 strokes	(South Africa) Hugh Baiocchi (Japan) Kenji Hosoishi	São Fernando	
1967		(Argentina) Raúl Travieso	281	−7	5 strokes	(Argentina) Jorge Ledesma (a)	Itanhangá	
1966		(United States) Rex Baxter	277	−7	5 strokes	(Spain) Ramón Sota	São Paulo	
1965		(Spain) Ramón Sota	268	−4	Playoff	(United States) Gene Littler	Gavea	
1964		(Argentina) Roberto De Vicenzo (5)	285	+5	Playoff	(Argentina) Elcido Nari	São Fernando	
1963		(Argentina) Roberto De Vicenzo (4)	279	−9	5 strokes	(Wales) Dave Thomas	Itanhangá	
1962		(England) Bernard Hunt	273	−11	5 strokes	(Wales) Dave Thomas	São Paulo	
1961		(England) Peter Alliss	272	E	4 strokes	(Brazil) Mário Gonzalez	Gavea	
1960		(Argentina) Roberto De Vicenzo (3)	271	−13	3 strokes	(United States) Mike Souchak	São Paulo	
1959		(United States) Billy Casper (2)	268	−4	6 strokes	(Brazil) Mário Gonzalez	Gavea	
1958		(United States) Billy Casper	270	−14	9 strokes	(Argentina) Leopoldo Ruiz	São Paulo	
1957		(Argentina) Roberto De Vicenzo (2)	281		8 strokes	(Argentina) Leopoldo Ruiz	Itanhangá	
1956		(Argentina) Fidel de Luca	278		2 strokes	(Argentina) Antonio Cerdá	São Paulo	
1955		(Brazil) Mário Gonzalez (7)	275		6 strokes	(Argentina) Arturo Soto	Gavea	
1954		(Argentina) Roberto De Vicenzo	277		4 strokes	(Brazil) Mário Gonzalez	São Paulo	
1953		(Brazil) Mário Gonzalez (6)	270		4 strokes	(Argentina) Martin Pose	Gavea	
1952		(United States) Sam Snead	267		12 strokes	(Brazil) Ricardo Rossi	São Paulo	
1951		(Brazil) Mário Gonzalez (5)	272		3 strokes	(Argentina) Roberto De Vicenzo	Gavea	
1950		(Brazil) Mário Gonzalez (4)	270			(Argentina) Roberto De Vicenzo	São Paulo	
1949		(Brazil) Mário Gonzalez (3)	269			(Argentina) Roberto De Vicenzo	Gavea	
1948		(Brazil) Mário Gonzalez (a) (2)	270		2 strokes	(United States) Frank Stranahan (a)	São Paulo	
1947: No tournament
1946		(Brazil) Mário Gonzalez (a)	274		1 stroke	(Argentina) Roberto De Vicenzo	São Paulo	
1945		(Argentina) Martin Pose	275		2 strokes	(Argentina) Roberto De Vicenzo	Gavea	

== See also ==
- Open golf tournament
