= Great Britain–Argentina Professional Match =

Tournament information
- Location: Leeds, England
- Established: 1939
- Course(s): Lady Dorothy Course; Temple Newsam Golf Club
- Format: Team match play
- Month played: June

Final champion
- Great Britain

Location in England

The Great Britain–Argentina Professional Match was a men's team golf competition between teams of six professional golfers from Great Britain and Argentina. It was played on the Lady Dorothy Course at Temple Newsam Golf Club on Monday 5 June 1939, just before the Yorkshire Evening News Tournament which started the following day. The match resulted in a 5–3 victory for the British team with one match halved.

== Background ==
A team of six golfers from Argentine visited Europe in the summer of 1939, under the auspices of the Argentine Golf Association. The team was accompanied by Juan Dentone and Armando Blasi. The team arrived in England at the end of May and stayed until mid-July. During their stay they played in the Yorkshire Evening News Tournament, the Open de France and The Open Championship. They also played in a number of exhibition matches. The match between the team and a team of British professionals selected by the PGA was arranged for the day before the start of the Yorkshire Evening News Tournament. The captains were Arthur Lacey and José Jurado.

Martin Pose was the most successful player during the tour. He reached the semi-final of the Yorkshire Evening News Tournament before losing to Dai Rees at the 20th hole. He then won the Open de France at Le Touquet, beating Tom Odams by a stroke. He was also the leading Argentine golfer in the Open Championship, on the Old Course, finishing in 8th place, having been in second place after the first two days.

== Format ==
The match was contested on a single day. There were three 18-hole foursomes matches in the morning with six 18-hole single matches in the afternoon.

== Morning foursomes matches ==
	Results
Dai Rees/Arthur Lacey	(United Kingdom) 2 & 1	Marcos Churio/Martin Pose
Don Curtis/Jimmy Adams	(United Kingdom) 2 up	José Jurado/Enrique Bertolino
Tom Collinge/Cecil Denny	halved	Aurelio Castañon/Juan Martínez
2	Session	0
2	Overall	0

== Afternoon singles matches ==
	Results
Dai Rees	(United Kingdom) 3 & 2	Aurelio Castañon
Arthur Lacey	(Argentina) 2 & 1	Martin Pose
Don Curtis	(Argentina) 1 up	Marcos Churio
Jimmy Adams	(Argentina) 2 up	José Jurado
Tom Collinge	(United Kingdom) 1 up	Enrique Bertolino
Cecil Denny	(United Kingdom) 8 & 7	Juan Martínez
3	Session	3
5	Overall	3
