= Los Lagartos Open =

Golf tournament

Tournament information
- Location: Bogotá, Colombia
- Established: 1964
- Course: Los Lagartos Country Club
- Par: 72
- Tour: Caribbean Tour

Location map
- Location in Colombia

The Los Lagartos Open or Abierto Internacional de Los Lagartos is a golf tournament that has been held at Los Lagartos Country Club in Bogotá, Colombia since 1964.

Between 1964 and 1974, it was a fixture on the PGA Tour-sponsored Caribbean Tour. Several major champions won the event, including Art Wall Jr., Roberto De Vicenzo, and Tony Jacklin. The event has been referred to as the Los Lagartos International.

== Winners ==
Year	Player	Country	Score	To par	Margin of victory	Runner(s)-up	Ref
1978	Peter Townsend	England	282	−6	3 strokes	(Argentina) Roberto De Vicenzo (England) Tony Jacklin	
1975–1977: Tournament not held
1974	Tony Jacklin	England	273	−15	3 strokes	(Argentina) Roberto De Vicenzo (Argentina) Florentino Molina (Colombia) Alberto Rivadeneira	
1973	Tony Jacklin	England	261	−27	13 strokes	(United States) Gene Borek	
1972	Peter Townsend	England	274	−14	4 strokes	(United States) Gene Borek	
1971	Bert Greene	United States	277	−11	2 strokes	(Colombia) Rogelio González	
1970	Bert Greene	United States	268	−14	4 strokes	(United States) Rocky Thompson	
1969	Roberto De Vicenzo	Argentina	274	−14	3 strokes	(United States) Larry Mowry	
1968	Roberto De Vicenzo	Argentina	269	−19	5 strokes	(United States) Butch Baird	
1967	Butch Baird	United States	277	−11	3 strokes	(United States) Bert Weaver	
1966	Roberto De Vicenzo	Argentina	270	−18	4 strokes	(United States) Tom Nieporte	
1965	Roberto De Vicenzo	Argentina	272	−16	4 strokes	(United States) Al Besselink	
1964	Art Wall Jr.	United States	280	−8	2 strokes	(United States) Al Besselink	
