= Argentine Open =

Annual golf tournament

Visa Argentina Open
Tournament information
- Location: Buenos Aires, Argentina
- Established: 1905
- Course: Jockey Club
- Par: 70
- Length: 6,836 yards (6,251 m)
- Tours: European Tour; Korn Ferry Tour; Challenge Tour; PGA Tour Latinoamérica; Tour de las Américas; TPG Tour
- Format: Stroke play
- Prize fund: US$1,000,000
- Month played: February/March

Tournament record score
- Aggregate: 257 Justin Suh (2025)
- To par: −23 as above

Current champion
- (United States) Alistair Docherty

Final champion
- Location in Argentina

The Argentine Open or Abierto de la República or Abierto de Argentina is one of the oldest national golf open championships. First played in 1905, when it was called the Open Championship of the River Plate, it has featured numerous notable winners including eleven major champions Henry Picard (1937), Paul Runyan (1938), Jimmy Demaret (1941), Lloyd Mangrum (1946), Roberto De Vicenzo (1944, 1949, 1951, 1952,1958, 1965, 1967, 1970, 1974) Tom Weiskopf (1979), Craig Stadler (1992), Mark Calcavecchia (1993, 1995), Mark O'Meara (1994), Jim Furyk (1997) and Ángel Cabrera (2001, 2002, 2012).

== History ==
The championship was formerly part of the PGA Tour Latinoamérica schedule, also featuring on the European Tour on one occasion, in 2001. In the subsequent years, the Argentine financial crisis later in 2001 resulted in substantially reduced prize money. From 2005 to 2008 the tournament was a fixture on the Challenge Tour. In 2008 it was rescheduled to April, which meant that the Argentine Open appeared twice during the 2008 Challenge Tour season.

The record for most victories is held by 1967 British Open champion Roberto De Vicenzo, who won the title on nine occasions between 1944 and 1974. The next most successful players are Vicente Fernández, with eight victories over a 32 years span between 1968 and 2000 and José Jurado, who won seven times between the 1920 and 1931.

The first championship, held in 1905, was won by Mungo Park Jr. (son of Willie Park Sr. and brother of Willie Park Jr.).

The low amateur is presented with the Pereyra Iraola Cup.

Starting in 2016, the event gave the winner an exemption into The Open Championship.

In July 2023, it was announced that the tournament would become part of the Korn Ferry Tour schedule until 2029.

== Winners ==
| Year | Tour(s) (Note: ARG − PGA of Argentina Tour; CHA − Challenge Tour; EUR − European Tour; KFT − Korn Ferry Tour; PGATLA − PGA Tour Latinoamérica; TLA − Tour de las Américas; TPG − TPG Tour.) | Winner | Score | To par | Margin of victory | Runner(s)-up | Venue |
Visa Argentina Open
| 2026 | KFT | (United States) Alistair Docherty | 258 | −22 | 1 stroke | (United States) Chris Korte (South Korea) Noh Seung-yul | Jockey Club |
| 2025 | KFT | (United States) Justin Suh | 257 | −23 | 5 strokes | (United States) Ian Holt (South Korea) Kim Seong-hyeon (United States) Cole Sherwood | Jockey Club |
| 2024 | KFT | (United States) Mason Andersen | 263 | −17 | Playoff | (Norway) Kristoffer Ventura | Olivos |
2023: No tournament due to rescheduling from December to March
Visa Open de Argentina
| 2022 | PGATLA | (United States) Zack Fischer | 270 | −18 | 1 stroke | (Sweden) Linus Lilliedahl | Nordelta |
| 2021 | PGATLA | (Argentina) Jorge Fernández-Valdés | 277 | −11 | 3 strokes | (South Korea) Cho Rak-hyun (France) Jérémy Gandon | Nordelta |
2020: No tournament
| 2019 | PGATLA | (Colombia) Ricardo Celia | 269 | −11 | Playoff | (United States) Brandon Matthews | Jockey Club |
| 2018 | PGATLA | (Mexico) Isidro Benítez | 270 | −18 | 3 strokes | (Canada) Russell Budd (United States) Harry Higgs | Pilara |
| 2017 | PGATLA | (United States) Brady Schnell | 272 | −8 | Playoff | (Norway) Andreas Halvorsen (United States) Matt Ryan | Jockey Club |
| 2016 | PGATLA | (United States) Kent Bulle (2) | 275 | −9 | Playoff | (United States) James Beck III (United States) Nate Lashley | Olivos |
| 2015 | PGATLA | (United States) Kent Bulle | 269 | −11 | 1 stroke | (Uruguay) Juan Álvarez (a) | Jockey Club |
| 2014 | PGATLA | (Argentina) Emiliano Grillo | 266 | −18 | 6 strokes | (United States) Brad Hopfinger | Martindale |
| 2013 | PGATLA | (Colombia) Marcelo Rozo | 278 | −10 | 2 strokes | (United States) Jeff Gove | Nordelta |
| 2012 | PGATLA | (Argentina) Ángel Cabrera (3) | 270 | −18 | 4 strokes | (Argentina) Miguel Ángel Carballo (Mexico) Óscar Fraustro | Nordelta |
| 2011 | TLA, TPG | (Argentina) Maximiliano Godoy | 278 | −6 | 2 strokes | (Dominican Republic) Guillermo Pumarol | Pilar |
Abierto Visa de la República
| 2010 | TLA, TPG | (Venezuela) Jhonattan Vegas | 270 | −10 | 6 strokes | (Argentina) Andrés Romero | Jockey Club |
| 2009 | TLA, TPG | (Argentina) César Costilla | 282 | −6 | 1 stroke | (Argentina) Paulo Pinto (Argentina) Julio Zapata | Nordelta |
| 2008 | CHA, TLA, TPG | (Finland) Antti Ahokas | 270 | −10 | 3 strokes | (Argentina) Martin Monguzzi | Hurlingham |
| 2007 | CHA, TLA, TPG | (Paraguay) Marco Ruiz | 275 | −5 | 2 strokes | (Argentina) Daniel Vancsik | Buenos Aires |
| 2006 | ARG, CHA, TLA | (Argentina) Rafael Echenique | 277 | −7 | 1 stroke | (Argentina) Ángel Cabrera (Argentina) Ricardo González | Pilar |
| 2005 | ARG, CHA, TLA | (United States) Kevin Stadler | 274 | −6 | 2 strokes | (Argentina) Ángel Cabrera | Jockey Club |
| 2004 | ARG | (Argentina) José Cóceres | 278 | −2 | Playoff | (Argentina) Eduardo Romero | Buenos Aires |
| 2003 | ARG | (Argentina) Rodolfo González | 281 | +1 | Playoff | (Argentina) Clodomiro Carranza | Olivos |
Abierto de Argentina
| 2002 | ARG, TLA | (Argentina) Ángel Cabrera (2) | 269 | −11 | 4 strokes | (Argentina) José Cóceres | Hurlingham |
Open de Argentina
| 2001 | ARG, EUR | (Argentina) Ángel Cabrera | 268 | −12 | 2 strokes | (Sweden) Carl Pettersson | Jockey Club |
Argentine Open
| 2000 | ARG | (Argentina) Vicente Fernández (7) | 277 | −3 | Playoff | (Argentina) Eduardo Romero | Jockey Club |
Abierto de la República
| 1999 | | (United States) Scott Dunlap | 272 | −12 | 1 stroke | (Argentina) José Cóceres (Wales) Ian Woosnam | Martindale |
Argentine Open
| 1998 | | (Paraguay) Raúl Fretes | 271 | −9 | | (Argentina) Ángel Cabrera (Spain) Sergio García (a) (Colombia) Gustavo Mendoza | Jockey Club |
| 1997 | | (United States) Jim Furyk | 275 | −5 | 3 strokes | (United States) Chris DiMarco (Sweden) Mathias Grönberg (United States) Tim Hegna | Jockey Club |
| 1996 | | (Paraguay) Pedro Martínez | 272 | −12 | | (United States) Tim Herron | Olivos |
| 1995 | | (United States) Mark Calcavecchia (2) | 279 | | Playoff | (United States) Andrew Magee | Jockey Club |
| 1994 | | (United States) Mark O'Meara | 278 | | | (United States) John Cook (Argentina) César Monasterio | Buenos Aires |
| 1993 | | (United States) Mark Calcavecchia | 270 | | | (Argentina) Miguel Guzmán | Jockey Club |
| 1992 | | (United States) Craig Stadler | 276 | | Playoff | (Argentina) Eduardo Romero | Olivos |
| 1991 | | (United States) Jay Don Blake | 273 | | | (United States) Craig Stadler | Argentino |
| 1990 | | (Argentina) Vicente Fernández (7) | 268 | | | (Argentina) Eduardo Romero | Mar del Plata |
| 1989 | | (Argentina) Eduardo Romero | 275 | | | (Argentina) Luis Carbonetti | Argentino |
| 1988 | | (Argentina) Miguel Fernández (2) | 264 | | | (Argentina) Vicente Fernández | Hurlingham |
| 1987 | | (Argentina) Miguel Fernández | 277 | | | (Spain) Miguel Ángel Martín (Argentina) Eduardo Romero | Córdoba |
| 1986 | | (Argentina) Vicente Fernández (6) | 278 | | | (Argentina) Miguel Fernández | San Isidro |
| 1985 | | (Argentina) Vicente Fernández (5) | 283 | | | (Mexico) Rafael Alarcón (Argentina) Antonio Ortiz (Argentina) Adan Sowa | Ranelagh |
| 1984 | | (Argentina) Vicente Fernández (4) | 279 | | | (Argentina) Antonio Ortiz | Olivos |
| 1983 | | (Argentina) Adan Sowa (2) | 283 | | | (Argentina) Antonio Ortiz | San Andrés |
| 1982 | | (Argentina) Jorge Soto | 283 | | | (Argentina) Vicente Fernández | Olivos |
| 1981 | | (Argentina) Vicente Fernández (3) | 274 | | | (United States) Jack Ferenz | Jockey Club |
| 1980 | | (United States) Gary Hallberg | 280 | | | (Argentina) Vicente Fernández | Jockey Club |
| 1979 | | (United States) Tom Weiskopf | 289 | +5 | 3 strokes | (Colombia) Alberto Rivadeneira | Olivos |
| 1978 | | (Argentina) Adan Sowa | 283 | | | (Scotland) Sam Torrance | Jockey Club |
| 1977 | | (Argentina) Florentino Molina (5) | 278 | | | (Argentina) Vicente Fernández | Olivos |
| 1976 | | (Argentina) Florentino Molina (4) | 274 | | | (Argentina) Vicente Fernández | Jockey Club |
| 1975 | | (Argentina) Florentino Molina (3) | 281 | | | (Argentina) Roberto De Vicenzo | Lomas |
| 1974 | | (Argentina) Roberto De Vicenzo (9) | 273 | | | (Argentina) Vicente Fernández | Mar del Plata |
| 1973 | | (Argentina) Florentino Molina (2) | 272 | | | (Argentina) Fidel de Luca (Argentina) Leopoldo Ruiz | Hurlingham |
| 1972 | | (Argentina) Fidel de Luca (4) | 283 | | | (Argentina) Juan Quinteros (Argentina) Jorge Soto | Córdoba |
| 1971 | | (Argentina) Florentino Molina | 275 | | | (Argentina) Vicente Fernández | Hindú |
| 1970 | | (Argentina) Roberto De Vicenzo (8) | 285 | | | (Argentina) Fidel de Luca | Río Cuarto |
| 1969 | | (Argentina) Vicente Fernández (2) | 271 | | | (Argentina) Fidel de Luca (Argentina) Orlando Tudino | Ranelagh |
| 1968 | | (Argentina) Vicente Fernández | 279 | | | (Argentina) Fidel de Luca | Argentino |
| 1967 | | (Argentina) Roberto De Vicenzo (7) | 282 | | | (Colombia) Alberto Rivadeneira | San Andres |
| 1966 | | (Argentina) Juan Carlos Castillo | 277 | | | (Argentina) Sebastian Nicolosi | Jockey Club |
| 1965 | | (Argentina) Roberto De Vicenzo (6) | 277 | | | (Argentina) Orlando Tudino | Hurlingham |
| 1964 | | (Argentina) Elcido Nari | 283 | | | (Argentina) Juan Martínez | San Isidro |
| 1963 | | (Argentina) Jorge Ledesma (a) | 282 | | | (Argentina) Roberto De Vicenzo | San Martín |
| 1962 | | (Spain) Ángel Miguel | 285 | | | (Argentina) Florentino Molina | Ituzaingó |
| 1961 | | (Argentina) Fidel de Luca (3) | 287 | | | (Argentina) Esteban Sorolla | Lomas |
| 1960 | | (Argentina) Fidel de Luca (2) | 274 | | | (Argentina) Leopoldo Ruiz | Mar del Plata |
| 1959 | | (Argentina) Leopoldo Ruiz (2) | 289 | | | (Argentina) Eduardo Blasi | Hindú |
| 1958 | | (Argentina) Roberto De Vicenzo (5) | 278 | | | (Argentina) Orlando Tudino | Rosario |
| 1957 | | (Argentina) Leopoldo Ruiz | 284 | | | (Argentina) Juan Anzaldo (Argentina) Juan Martínez | Ranelagh |
| 1956 | | (Argentina) Antonio Cerdá (2) | 281 | | | (Argentina) Fidel de Luca | Córdoba |
| 1955 | | (Argentina) Enrique Bertolino (2) | 273 | | | (Argentina) Roberto De Vicenzo | Argentinos |
| 1954 | | (Argentina) Fidel de Luca | 281 | | Playoff | (Argentina) Arturo Soto | Argentinos |
| 1953 | | (Brazil) Mário Gonzalez (2) | 280 | | | (Argentina) Roberto De Vicenzo | Argentinos |
| 1952 | | (Argentina) Roberto De Vicenzo (4) | 287 | | | (Argentina) Juan Anzaldo | San Andrés |
| 1951 | | (Argentina) Roberto De Vicenzo (3) | 278 | | | (Argentina) Antonio Cerdá | San Isidro |
| 1950 | | (Argentina) Martin Pose (3) | 283 | | Playoff | (Argentina) Enrique Bertolino | Hurlingham |
| 1949 | | (Argentina) Roberto De Vicenzo (2) | 270 | | | (Argentina) Juan Anzaldo | Olivos |
| 1948 | | (Argentina) Antonio Cerdá | 286 | | | (Argentina) Juan Anzaldo | Hindú |
| 1947 | | (Argentina) Enrique Bertolino | 279 | | | (Argentina) Roberto De Vicenzo | Argentino |
| 1946 | | (United States) Lloyd Mangrum | 271 | | Playoff | (United States) Vic Ghezzi | Jockey Club |
1945: No tournament
| 1944 | | (Argentina) Roberto De Vicenzo | 288 | | | (Argentina) Arturo Soto | Ituzaingo |
| 1943 | | (Argentina) Marcos Churio (3) | 288 | | | (Argentina) Leonardo Nicolosi (Argentina) Emilio Serra | San Andrés |
| 1942 | | (Argentina) Manuel Martín | 298 | | | (Argentina) Pedro Ledesma (a) | Olivos |
| 1941 | | (United States) Jimmy Demaret | 279 | | 4 strokes | (Argentina) Eduardo Blasi (Argentina) Enrique Bertolino | San Isidro |
| 1940 | | (Brazil) Mário Gonzalez (a) | 285 | | | (Argentina) Leonardo Nicolosi (Argentina) Emilio Serra | Argentino |
| 1939 | | (Argentina) Martin Pose (2) | 292 | | Playoff | (Argentina) Emilio Serra | Ranelagh |
| 1938 | | (United States) Paul Runyan | 282 | | | (Argentina) Andrés A. Pérez (Argentina) Martin Pose | Ituzaingó |
| 1937 | | (United States) Henry Picard | 288 | | | (Argentina) Marcos Churio (Argentina) Emilio Dunezat | San Andrés |
| 1936 | | (Scotland) John Cruickshank (2) | 290 | | | (Argentina) Juan Martínez | San Olivos |
| 1935 | | (Scotland) John Cruickshank | 295 | | | (Argentina) Marcos Churio | Argentino |
| 1934 | | (Argentina) Marcos Churio (2) | 285 | | | (Argentina) Enrique Bertolino | Argentino |
| 1933 | | (Argentina) Martin Pose | 292 | | | (Argentina) Tomas Genta | Ituzaingó |
| 1932 | | (Argentina) Andrés A. Pérez (4) | 297 | | | (Argentina) Marcos Churio (Argentina) Hector Frecero | Ranelagh |
| 1931 | | (Argentina) José Jurado (7) | 289 | | | (Scotland) John Cruickshank | Jockey Club |
| 1930 | | (Argentina) Tomás Genta | 288 | | | (Scotland) John Cruickshank (Argentina) José Jurado | San Andrés |
| 1929 | | (Argentina) José Jurado (6) | 292 | | | (Argentina) Marcos Churio | Ituzaingó |
| 1928 | | (Argentina) José Jurado (5) | 293 | | | (Argentina) Marcos Churio | San Andrés |
| 1927 | | (Argentina) José Jurado (4) | 298 | | | (Argentina) Juan Eustace (Argentina) Andrés A. Pérez | Lomas |
| 1926 | | (Argentina) Marcos Churio | 294 | | | (Argentina) Lagrima Gonzalez | Argentino |
| 1925 | | (Argentina) José Jurado (3) | 320 | | | (Argentina) Lagrima Gonzalez | Lomas |
| 1924 | | (Argentina) José Jurado (2) | 291 | | | (Argentina) Ramon Rivarola | San Andrés |
| 1923 | | (Argentina) Andrés A. Pérez (3) | 302 | | | (Argentina) José Jurado | San Andrés |
| 1922 | | (Argentina) Andrés A. Pérez (2) | 300 | | | (Argentina) José Jurado | San Andrés |
| 1921 | | (Argentina) Andrés A. Pérez | 303 | | | (Argentina) José Jurado | Argentino |
| 1920 | | (Argentina) José Jurado | 307 | | | (Argentina) Andrés A. Pérez | San Andrés |
| 1919 | | (Argentina) Raúl Castillo (3) | 307 | | | (Argentina) José Jurado | Argentino |
| 1918 | | (Argentina) Juan Eustace | 328 | | | (Argentina) Raúl Castillo | San Andrés |
| 1917 | | (Argentina) Lágrima González (3) | 305 | | | (Argentina) Raúl Castillo (Argentina) Juan Eustace | Lomas |
| 1916 | | (Argentina) Lágrima González (2) | 305 | | | (Argentina) Raúl Castillo | Argentino |
| 1915 | | (Argentina) Lágrima González | 305 | | | (Scotland) Alex Philp | Argentino |
| 1914 | | (Argentina) Raúl Castillo (2) | 318 | | | (Argentina) Lágrima González | San Andrés |
| 1913 | | (Scotland) Alex Philp (2) | 328 | | | (Scotland) Mungo Park Jr. | San Andrés |
| 1912 | | (Scotland) Mungo Park Jr. (3) | 308 | | | (Argentina) Lágrima González (Argentina) Juan Eustace | San Andrés |
| 1911 | | (Argentina) Rodolfo Castillo | 301 | | | (Argentina) Juan Eustace | San Andrés |
| 1910 | | (Scotland) Alex Philp | 306 | | | (Argentina) Juan Eustace | Argentino |
| 1909 | | (Argentina) Raúl Castillo | 317 | | | (Argentina) P. Aste (a) (Argentina) E. Donet (a) | San Andrés |
| 1908 | | (England) Frank Sutton (a) | 307 | | | (Scotland) Mungo Park Jr. | Buenos Aires |
| 1907 | | (Scotland) Mungo Park Jr. (2) | 305 | | | (Scotland) Jack Park | Buenos Aires |
| 1906 | | (England) John Avery Wright (a) | 158 | | | (Scotland) Mungo Park Jr. (England) Frank Sutton (a) | Buenos Aires |
| 1905 | | (Scotland) Mungo Park Jr. | 167 | | | (Argentina) Juan Dentone (England) H. Bucknall (a) | Buenos Aires |

== See also ==
- Open golf tournament
