= South Open =

Tournament information
- Location: Mar del Plata, Argentina
- Established: 1918
- Course(s): Mar del Plata GC
- Par: 70
- Tour(s): PGA Tour Latinoamérica Developmental Series
- Format: Stroke play
- Month played: February

Tournament record score
- Aggregate: 256 Miguel Ángel Martín

Current champion
- (Argentina) Julián Etulain

The South Open, or Abierto del Sur, is one of the major regional open golf tournaments in Argentina, and is also one of the oldest, having been inaugurated 1918. It has always been held at the Mar del Plata Golf Club in Mar del Plata, Buenos Aires Province. The course plays to a par of 70, and the course record is 59, which was set by Miguel Ángel Martín in the 1987 Open.

The tournament was founded as the Abierto de Aficionados y Profesionales (the Professionals and Amateurs Open), and was renamed as the Abierto de Mar del Plata (Mar del Plata Open) in 1925, before being given its current title in 1939.

== Winners ==
Year	Winner	Score	Runner-up	Amateur winner
2024	Julián Etulain	269	Marcos Montenegro	
2023	Ricardo González	269	Jaime López Rivarola, Exequiel López	
2022	Franco Romero	266	Rafael Echenique	
2021				
2020	Jorge Fernández-Valdés	266	Paulo Pinto, Luciano Giometti	
2019	Estanislao Goya	265	Julio Zapata	
2018	Ricardo González	260		
2017	Marcos Monttenegro (a)	264	Clodomiro Carranza	
2016	Francisco Bidé	270	Emilio Domínguez, Maximiliano Godoy	
2015	Francisco Bidé	269	Nelson Ledesma, Francisco Ojeda	
2014	Nelson Ledesma	268	Emilio Domínguez	
2013	Sebastián Saavedra	272	Niclas Johansson	
2012	Mauricio Molina	196	Rafael Echenique	
2011	Matías O'Curry	263	Clodomiro Carranza	
2010				
2009	Rodolfo González*	271	Sebastian Saavedra, Miguel Ángel Carballo	Gonzalo Ramacciotti
2008	Julio Zapata	271	Miguel Guzmán	Esteban Martinez
2007	Rafael Gómez	266	Carlos Cardeza	Ary Rodriguez
2006	Luciano Giometti	278	Andrés Romero	Juan I. Gil
2005	Rodolfo González*	280	Paulo Pinto, Daniel Barbetti	Alan Wagner
2004	Ángel Cabrera	270	Miguel Guzmán	Tomas Argonz
2003	Rubén Alvarez	274	Armando Saavedra, Gustavo Rojas, C. Machado, F. Montovia	Emilio Domínguez
2002	No tournament			Luciano Giometti
2001	Juan Pablo Abbate*	276	Alberto Gianone	Nicasio Dominguez
2000	Fabian Montovia	266	Raúl Fretes	Nicolas Sedler
1999	Rodolfo González	276	Jorge Berendt	Gonzalo Ramaciotti
1998	Miguel Guzmán	279	Luis Carbonetti, Sebastián Fernández	Ernesto Rivas
1997	Jorge Berendt	269	Sebastián Fernández	Francisco Aleman
1996	Ángel Cabrera		Mauricio Molina, Eduardo Romero	Francisco Aleman
1995	Daniel Lobos		Eduardo Romero	Francisco Aleman
1994	Ángel Cabrera		Antonio Ortiz, Luis Carbonetti	Martin Travella
1993	Jorge Soto	268	Eduardo Romero, Luis Carbonetti	Gustavo Piovano
1992	Eduardo Romero			Jorge Bollini
1991	Rubén Alvarez			Fernando Chiesa
1990	Miguel Guzmán			Fernando Chiesa
1989	Miguel Guzmán		Ricardo Cóceres	Fernando Chiesa
1988	Eduardo Romero			Fernando Chiesa
1987	Miguel Ángel Martín	256	Vicente Fernández, Eduardo Romero	Diego Ventureira
1986	Vicente Fernández	272	Roberto De Vicenzo	Carlos Melara
1985	Florentino Molina	266	Roberto De Vicenzo	Carlos Melara
1984	Norberto Fuentes	275	Armando Saavedra, Adan Sowa, Jorge Soto	Luis Carbonetti
1983	Jorge Soto	276	Miguel Prado (amateur)	Miguel Prado
1982	Armando Saavedra		Horacio Carbonetti	
1981	Vicente Fernández		Florentino Molina, Armando Saavedra	Carlos Melara
1980	No tournament			Carlos Melara
1979	No tournament			Carlos Melara
1978	Roberto De Vicenzo*	213	Fidel de Luca	Luis Daneri
1977	Roberto De Vicenzo		Juan Carlos Cabrera	
1976	Juan Quinteros		Armando Saavedra	
1975	Vicente Fernández	279		Juan Carlos Devoto
1974	Fidel de Luca	277		Roberto Benito
1973	Roberto De Vicenzo	268		Juan Carlos Devoto
1972	Roberto De Vicenzo	270	Fidel de Luca	Jorge Ledesma
1971	Orlando Tudino	273		Roberto Monguzzi
1970	Leopoldo Ruiz	273		Jorge Ledesma
1969	Juan Carlos Nuñez	276		Horacio Berthe
1968	Orlando Tudino	280		Jorge Ledesma
1967	Roberto De Vicenzo	272		Alfredo Vercelli
1966	Leopoldo Ruiz	273		Roberto Hume
1965	Elcido Nari*	275	Juan Querelos	Roberto Hume
1964	Juan Querelos	281		Jorge Ledesma
1963	Fidel de Luca	284	Juan Martinez	Jorge Ledesma
1962	Roberto De Vicenzo	271		Roberto Hume
1961	Juan Martinez	281	Jose Maria Gonzalez	Jorge Ledesma
1960	Enrique Bertolino	273		Jorge Ledesma
1959	Esteban Sorolla	275		Roberto Hume
1958	Juan Querelos	278		Roberto Benito
1957	Leopoldo Ruiz	271		Carlos Brachts
1956	Enrique Bertolino*	278	Martin Pose, Leopoldo Ruiz, Juan Martinez	Jorge Ledesma
1955	Antonio Cerdá	271	Roberto De Vicenzo	Jorge Ledesma
1954	Mário Gonzalez	276	Juan Martinez	Juan Segura
1953	Enrique Bertolino	278	Martin Pose	Juan Segura
1952	Juan Segura (amateur)	275	Romualdo Barbieri	Juan Segura
1951	Enrique Bertolino	273	Aurelio Castañon, Martin Pose	Roberto Hume
1950	Antonio Cerdá	273	Martin Pose	Roberto Hume
1949	Martin Pose	274	Roberto De Vicenzo	Carlos Brachts
1948	Arturo Soto*	283	Aurelio Castañon	Pedro Ledesma
1947	Roberto De Vicenzo	276		Alberto Texier
1946	Roberto De Vicenzo	273		Carlos Menditegui
1945	Enrique Bertolino	272		A.R. Raggio
1944	Enrique Bertolino	279		Alberto Anchorena
1943	Eduardo Blasi	272		Pedro Ledesma
1942	Marcos Churio	283		Pedro Ledesma
1941	Emilio Serra	274		M. Ayesa
1940	Martin Pose	271		Pedro Ledesma
1939	Juan Martinez	281		Alberto Anchorena
1938	Martin Pose	270		A. Gainza Paz
1937	John Cruickshank	279		Hector Villamil
1936	John Cruickshank	283	Garnet Dunsmure (amateur)	Garnet Dunsmure
1935	Martin Pose	275	Marcos Churio	Carlos Mugica
1934	Martin Pose	277	Marcos Churio	Alberto Anchorena
1933	José Jurado	281		Hector Villamil
1932	José Jurado	277	Aurelio Castañon	Hector Villamil
1931	Marcos Churio	276		Hector Villamil
1930	Henry Cotton	287	Aubrey Boomer	A. Gainza Paz
1929	Marcos Churio	285		Enrique Echague
1928	Marcos Churio	292		T. Sanderson
1927	Aubrey Boomer	282	José Jurado	Mariano Demaria Sala
1926	Andres Perez	279		Mariano Demaria Sala
1925	José Jurado	288		J.A. Brown
1924	José Jurado			A. Gainza Paz
1923	Pedro Churio			No tournament
1922	Tomas Ockenden			No tournament
1921	Pedro Churio			No tournament
1920	Pedro Churio			No tournament
1919	Lagrima Goznalez	293		No tournament
1918	Juan Dentone	289	Juan Eustace	J. Brown, John May
