= 1953 Canada Cup =

Coordinates: 45.443°N 73.832°W

Tournament information
- Dates: June 2–3
- Location: Montreal, Quebec, Canada
- Course: Beaconsfield Golf Club
- Format: 36 holes stroke play combined score

Statistics
- Par: 72
- Field: 7 two-man teams
- Cut: None

Champion
- Argentina; Antonio Cerdá & Roberto De Vicenzo
- 287 (−1)

The 1953 Canada Cup took place June 2–3 at the Beaconsfield Golf Club in Montreal, Quebec, Canada. It was the first Canada Cup event, which became the World Cup in 1967. The tournament was a 36-hole stroke play team event with 7 teams. Each team consisted of two players from a country, except that South African Bobby Locke and Englishman Harry Weetman played as a team. The combined score of each team determined the team results. Play was in pairs, two players from different countries. The Argentine team of Antonio Cerdá and Roberto De Vicenzo won by ten strokes over the Canadian team of Bill Kerr and Stan Leonard. Antonio Cerdá had the lowest individual score. The tournament was sponsored by John Jay Hopkins.

The second Hopkins Trophy match between the United States and Canada was played on the same course from June 5–7. This match was also sponsored by Hopkins and resulted in a 27–18 win for the American team. Bobby Locke and Peter Thomson played for the Canadian team.

== Teams ==
Country	Players
Argentina	Antonio Cerdá and Roberto De Vicenzo
Australia	Ossie Pickworth and Peter Thomson
Canada	Bill Kerr and Stan Leonard
England; South Africa	Bobby Locke and Harry Weetman
West Germany	Georg Bessner and Hans Goernert
Mexico	Al Escalante and Juan Neri
United States	Julius Boros and Jim Turnesa

== Scores ==
Place	Country	Score	To par
1	Argentina	145-142=287	−1
2	Canada	153-144=297	+9
3	Australia	155-143=298	+10
4	England; South Africa	146-153=299	+11
5	United States	160-144=304	+16
6	West Germany	160-152=312	+24
7	Mexico	163-157=320	+32

The leading individual scores were 140 by Antonio Cerdá and 144 by Stan Leonard.
