= Enrique Bertolino =

Argentine golfer

Personal information
- Full name: Enrique Bertolino
- Nationality: Argentina
- Born: 3 November 1912
- Died: 1997 (aged 84–85)

Career
- Sport: Golf
- Turned professional: 1932
- Professional wins: 21

Best results in major championships
- Masters Tournament: 50th: 1940
- PGA Championship: DNP
- U.S. Open: CUT: 1940
- The Open Championship: T6: 1956

Enrique Bertolino (3 November 1912 – 1997) is an Argentine professional golfer.

== Professional career ==
In 1932, Bertolino turned professional. He competed in Europe in 1939, 1954, and 1956; and on the PGA Tour in 1940, 1947, and 1948. His best finish on the PGA Tour was 15th place in the Bing Crosby Pro-Am in 1948. In 1956, he was 6th in the British Open. In 1940, along with Martin Pose, he was the first Argentine player to compete in the Masters Tournament. He also played in the U.S. Open the same year.

Bertolino won the Argentine Open in 1945 and 1947, and was second in 1934, 1941 and 1950. He also won the Argentine PGA Championship in 1933, 1935, and 1939, and was second in 1932, 1938 and 1942. In 1937, he won an exhibition match against Byron Nelson in Buenos Aires, and in 1939, along with Juan Martínez, won an exhibition match in Scotland against Jimmy Adams and Jack McLean 3–0, one foursomes match and two individual matches.

== Professional wins (21) ==
=== Argentine wins (18) ===
- 1933 Argentine PGA Championship
- 1935 Argentine PGA Championship
- 1939 Argentine PGA Championship
- 1943 Abierto del Litoral
- 1944 South Open
- 1945 South Open
- 1947 Argentine Open
- 1949 Center Open
- 1951 South Open, Center Open
- 1953 Abierto del Litoral, South Open
- 1955 Argentine Open, Metropolitano Open
- 1956 South Open, Municipal Championship
- 1959 Center Open
- 1960 South Open

=== Other wins (3) ===
- 1944 Montevideo Open (Uruguay)
- 1946 Chile Open (tie with Roberto De Vicenzo)
- 1950 Montevideo Open (Uruguay)

== Team appearances ==
- Great Britain–Argentina Professional Match (representing Argentina): 1939
- World Cup (representing Argentina): 1956
