= Chaco Open =

The Chaco Open, Abierto del Nordeste or Northeast Open, is a golf tournament on the TPG Tour, the official professional golf tour in Argentina. First held in 1970, it has always been held at the Chaco Golf Club, in Resistencia, Chaco Province. It took a hiatus from 2008 to 2010.

== Winners ==
Year	Winner	Score	Runner(s)-up
2013	Daniel Barbetti	138	Nelson Ledesma
2012	Luciano Dodda	273	Clodomiro Carranza
2011	Emilio Domínguez	274	César Costilla, Roberto Coceres
2008–10	No tournament		
2007	Fabián Gómez	276	Miguel Fernández
2006	Miguel Fernández		José Cóceres, Fabián Gómez
1997–2005	No tournament		
1996	Fabian Montovia*	272	Gustavo Rojas
1995			
1994			
1993			
1992			
1991			
1990			
1989			
1988			
1987	Armando Saavedra	263	Eduardo Romero
1986	Carlos Franco*		Miguel Fernández
1985			
1984	Eduardo Romero	277	Jorge Soto
1983	No tournament		
1982	Jorge Soto	277	Adan Sowa
1980–81	No tournament		
1979	Jorge Soto		
1978	Armando Saavedra	265	Vicente Fernández
1977	Juan Carlos Cabrera	274	Carlos Liberto
1976	Antonio Peralta	279	Horacio Carbonetti (amateur)
1975	Jorge Soto	273	Carlos Liberto
1974	Vicente Fernández	268	
1973	Vicente Fernández	268	
1972			
1971	Fidel de Luca		
1970			
