= Argentine PGA Championship =

Golf tournament

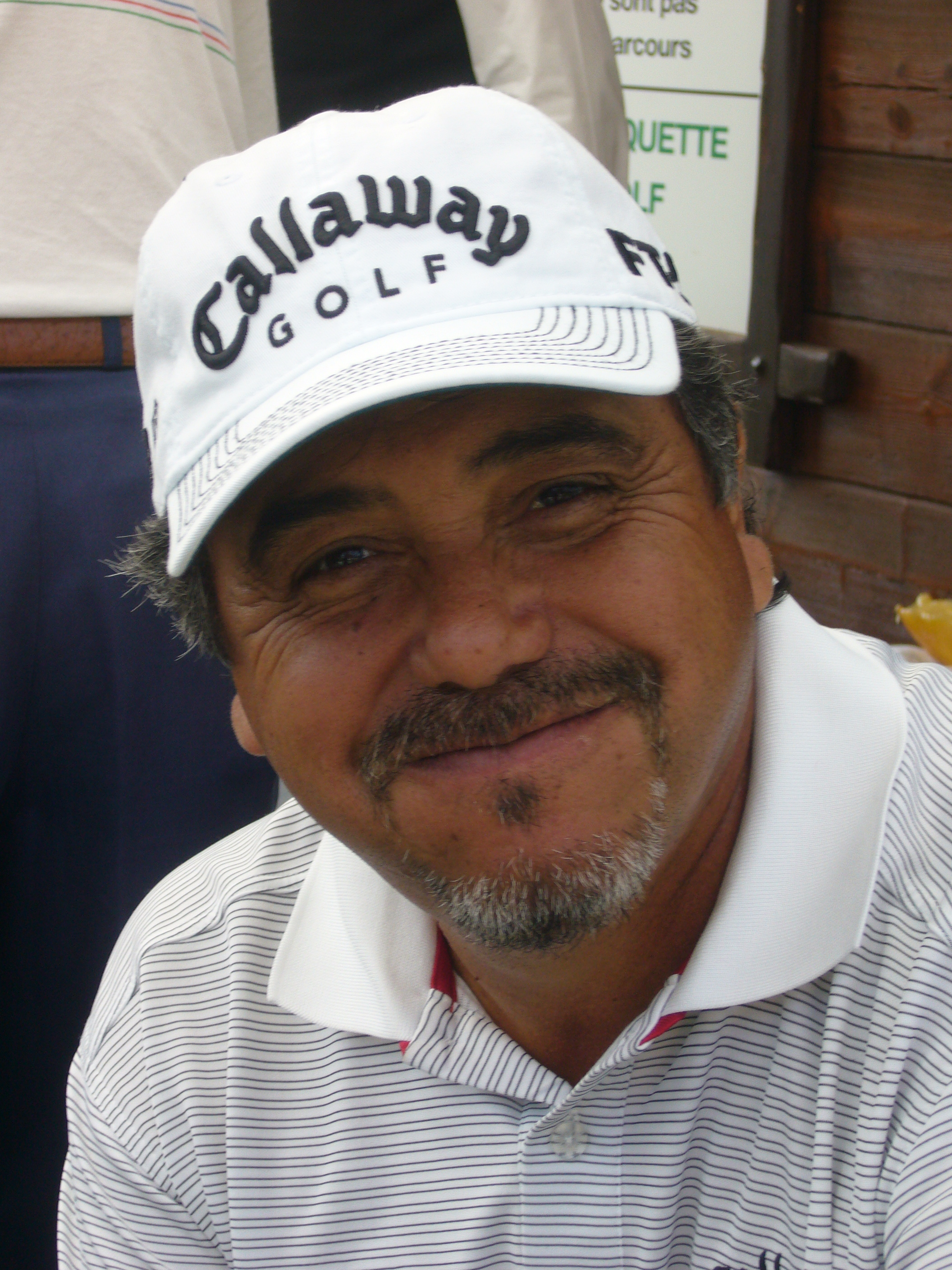
Eduardo Romero – eight-time winner

The Argentine PGA Championship is a golf tournament played in Argentina since 1920. It was generally supported by the leading Argentine golfers and its list of champions includes Eduardo Romero (8 times), José Jurado (7 times), Vicente Fernández (5 times), José Cóceres (twice) and Ángel Cabrera. However, the record holder is former British Open champion Roberto De Vicenzo, who recorded 16 victories between 1944 and 1985.

== Winners ==
| Year | Winner | Score | Runner-up | Venue |
|---|---|---|---|---|
| 2013 | Rafael Gómez | 278 | Gustavo Acosta, Carlos Franco | San Isidro GC |
| 2012 | Ricardo González | 279 | Francisco Bide, Clodomiro Carranza, Roberto Cóceres, Emilio Domínguez | JC Tucuman |
| 2011 | Sebastián Fernández | | Andrés Romero | JC Tucuman |
| 2006–10 | No tournament | | | |
| 2005 | Sebastián Fernández | 275 | Andrés Romero | San Eliseo G&CC |
| 2004 | José Cóceres | 272 | Rafael Echenique | Los Lagartos GC |
| 2003 | José Cóceres | 276 | Sebastián Fernández | Pilar GC |
| 2002 | Ángel Cabrera; Gustavo Rojas (tie) | 208 | | Pilar GC |
| 2001 | Sebastián Fernández | | Ángel Cabrera | Hindú Club |
| 2000 | No tournament | | | |
| 1999 | Eduardo Romero | 276 | Jorge Berendt | Buenos Aires GC |
| 1998 | Ángel Cabrera | 275 | Rodolfo González | San Isidro Golf Club |
| 1997 | Eduardo Romero | 279 | Vicente Fernández | Club Mar del Plata |
| 1996 | Eduardo Romero* | 268 | Ricardo González | Hindu Club |
| 1995 | Rubén Alvarez | 268 | Vicente Fernández | Hindu Club |
| 1994 | Armando Saavedra | 273 | César Monasterio | Lagartos GC |
| 1993 | Eduardo Romero* | 273 | Roberto Cóceres | Lagartos GC |
| 1992 | Eduardo Romero | 272 | Luis Carbonetti, Antonio Ortiz, Roberto Cóceres, Peter Townsend | Lagartos GC |
| 1991 | Sebastián Fernández | 275 | | Lagartos GC |
| 1990 | Eduardo Romero | 277 | | Jockey Club, Buenos Aires |
| 1989 | Jorge Soto | 200 | | Campo Municipal Palermo |
| 1988 | Antonio Ortiz | 271 | Vicente Fernández, Eduardo Romero | Campo Municipal Palermo |
| 1987 | Vicente Fernández | 275 | Eduardo Romero, Carlos Franco | Jockey Club, Buenos Aires |
| 1986 | Eduardo Romero | 273 | | Olivos GC |
| 1985 | Roberto De Vicenzo | 279 | Alberto Albornoz | GC General San Martin |
| 1984 | Jorge Soto | 278 | | Golfers GC |
| 1983 | Eduardo Romero* | 281 | Florentino Molina | Olivos GC |
| 1982 | Fidel de Luca | 282 | Adan Sowa | San Isidro GC |
| 1981 | Vicente Fernández | 271 | | Campo Municipal Palermo |
| 1980 | Vicente Fernández | 274 | Juan Carlos Molina | San Isidro GC |
| 1979 | Adan Sowa | 280 | Juan Carlos Cabrera, L. Mieres, Ramon Martinez | Campo Municipal Palermo |
| 1978 | Vicente Fernández | 278 | | Club Nautico San Isidro |
| 1977 | Roberto De Vicenzo | 273 | Julio Orillo, Jorge Soto | Campo Municipal Palermo |
| 1976 | Vicente Fernández | 285 | Juan Quinteros | Olivos |
| 1975 | Leopoldo Ruiz* | 282 | Vicente Fernández | Hindu Club |
| 1974 | Roberto De Vicenzo | 279 | Leopoldo Ruiz | San Andres GC |
| 1973 | Fidel de Luca | 264 | Florentino Molina, Roberto De Vicenzo | GC General San Martin |
| 1972 | Roberto De Vicenzo | 277 | Juan Quinteros | Ranelagh GC |
| 1971 | Roberto De Vicenzo | 270 | Vicente Fernández | San Isidro GC |
| 1970 | Florentino Molina | 274 | Fidel de Luca, Roberto De Vicenzo | Lomas Atletic Club |
| 1969 | Roberto De Vicenzo | 266 | Ruben Terrier | Hurlingham GC |
| 1968 | Fidel de Luca | 282 | Jorge Soto | San Isidro GC |
| 1967 | Leopoldo Ruiz | 288 | Orlando Tudino, Elcido Nari | Jockey Club, Buenos Aires |
| 1966 | Roberto De Vicenzo | 280 | Vicente Fernández | Jockey Club, Buenos Aires |
| 1965 | Roberto De Vicenzo | 290 | Rodolfo Sereda | San Andres GC |
| 1964 | Roberto De Vicenzo | 272 | Leopoldo Ruiz | Hurlingham GC |
| 1963 | Fidel de Luca | 291 | Roberto De Vicenzo | Jockey Club, Buenos Aires |
| 1962 | Fidel de Luca | 273 | Leopoldo Ruiz | Olivos GC |
| 1961 | Leopoldo Ruiz | 275 | Rodolfo Sereda | GC General San Martin |
| 1960 | Roberto De Vicenzo | 275 | Fidel de Luca | San Isidro GC |
| 1959 | Aurelio Castañon | 5&3 | Leonardo Nicolosi | San Andres GC |
| 1958 | Leopoldo Ruiz | 3&2 | Fidel de Luca | Jockey Club, Buenos Aires |
| 1957 | Sebastian Nicolosi | 3&2 | Arturo Soto | Hurlingham GC |
| 1956 | Leopoldo Ruiz | 3&2 | E. Moschiar | GC Argentino |
| 1955 | Martin Pose | 37 holes | R.J. Martinez | San Andres GC |
| 1954 | Martin Pose | 3&2 | Roberto De Vicenzo | Ituzaingo GC |
| 1953 | Leopoldo Ruiz | 6&5 | Elias De Vicenzo | Hindu Club |
| 1952 | Antonio Cerdá | 6&5 | Emilio Serra | GC General San Martin |
| 1951 | Roberto De Vicenzo | 5&4 | Antonio Cerdá | San Isidro GC |
| 1950 | Pedro Viola | 8&6 | Juan Martinez | Hurlingham GC |
| 1949 | Roberto De Vicenzo | 7&6 | Sebastian Nicolosi | Lomas Atletic Club |
| 1948 | Roberto De Vicenzo | 5&4 | Juan Querelos | Swift GC |
| 1947 | Roberto De Vicenzo | 5&4 | Eduardo Blasi | Ranelagh GC |
| 1946 | Emilio Serra | 5&4 | Roberto De Vicenzo | Hurlingham GC |
| 1945 | Roberto De Vicenzo | 5&4 | Martin Pose | San Andres GC |
| 1944 | Roberto De Vicenzo | 10&9 | Eduardo Blasi | Ituzaingo GC |
| 1943 | Eduardo Blasi | 3&2 | Juan Carlos Posse | Hindu Club |
| 1942 | Martin Posse | 4&2 | Enrique Bertolino | Olivos GC |
| 1941 | Eduardo Blasi | 2&1 | Emilio Serra | GC General San Martin |
| 1940 | Juan Martinez | 8&6 | Andres Perez | Jockey Club, Buenos Aires |
| 1939 | Enrique Bertolino | 5&3 | Juan Dunezat | San Isidro GC |
| 1938 | Aurelio Castañon | 1up | Enrique Bertolino | GC Argentino |
| 1937 | José Jurado | 3&1 | Martin Pose | GC Argentino |
| 1936 | Martin Posse | 1up | José Jurado | GC Argentino |
| 1935 | Enrique Bertolino | 2&1 | Martin Pose | GC Argentino |
| 1934 | John Cruickshank | 10&9 | José Jurado | GC Argentino |
| 1933 | Enrique Bertolino | 2&1 | Emilio Serra | GC Argentino |
| 1932 | Marcos Churio | | Enrique Bertolino | GC Argentino |
| 1931 | Marcos Churio | | | GC Argentino |
| 1930 | Marcos Churio | | | GC Argentino |
| 1929 | José Jurado | | | GC Argentino |
| 1928 | José Jurado | | | GC Argentino |
| 1927 | José Jurado | | | GC Argentino |
| 1926 | Marcos Churio | | | GC Argentino |
| 1925 | José Jurado | | | GC Argentino |
| 1924 | Ramon Rivarola | | | GC Argentino |
| 1923 | Andres A Perez | | | GC Argentino |
| 1922 | José Jurado | | | GC Argentino |
| 1921 | José Jurado | | | GC Argentino |
| 1920 | Lagrima Gonzalez | 5&3 | José Jurado | GC Argentino |
