= 1931 Open Championship =

Coordinates: 56.497°N 2.717°W

Tournament information
- Dates: 3–5 June 1931
- Location: Carnoustie, Angus, Scotland
- Course: Carnoustie Golf Links

Statistics
- Par: 72
- Length: 6,701 yards (6,127 m)
- Field: 109 players, 66 after cut
- Cut: 159 (+15)
- Prize fund: £500
- Winner's share: £100

Champion
- (Scotland) (United States) Tommy Armour
- 296 (+8)

Location in Scotland
Location in Angus, Scotland

The 1931 Open Championship was the 66th Open Championship, held 3–5 June at Carnoustie Golf Links in Carnoustie, Angus, Scotland. Tommy Armour outlasted José Jurado by a single stroke to win his only Open title, and his third and final major championship. This was the first time Carnoustie hosted the championship.

Qualifying took place on 1–2 June, Monday and Tuesday, with 18 holes at Carnoustie and 18 holes at Panmure Golf Club in nearby Barry, and the top 100 players and ties qualified. Macdonald Smith led the qualifiers on 141; the qualifying score was 160 and 109 players advanced. Prize money for the championship was increased to £500 with £100 for the champion, £75 for second place, £50 for third, £30 for fourth, £25 for fifth, £20 for sixth and seventh, £15 for eighth and ninth and £10 for the next 15 players.

Johnny Farrell, Henry Cotton, and Bill Twine led after the first round on Wednesday at even-par 72. Cotton shared the lead with Jurado after the second round at 147 (+3), with Armour a stroke behind. The top 60 and ties would make the cut; it was at 159 (+15) and 66 players advanced to the final rounds.

Cotton slipped back with a 79 in the third round on Friday morning, while Jurado shot 73 to open up a three-shot lead over Smith and Arthur Havers. Farrell and Reg Whitcombe were a stroke back in a tie for fourth and Armour, Percy Alliss, and Gene Sarazen were tied for sixth. Despite a shaky finish which saw him take eleven strokes on the last two holes, Alliss shot 73 and took the clubhouse lead at 298. Armour surpassed that total after a course-record 71, finishing at 296. Still on the course when Armour finished, Jurado needed a 75 to win the title. After making the turn in 36, he found trouble on the back-nine. Jurado arrived at the 17th needing to finish with fives on the last two holes to tie Armour, but his drive found the burn and he carded a six. Now needing a four on the last, he hit his approach to 9 feet (2.7 m), but his putt to tie just missed, securing the championship for Armour.

Armour, age 36 and a U.S. citizen, played the Open Championship just once more; he returned to Britain to defend his title in 1932 and finished in 17th place.

Defending champion Bobby Jones won the amateur grand slam in 1930 at age 28 and retired from competition; he did not compete again at the Open.

== Course ==
Championship Course

Hole	Name	Yards	Par	Hole	Name	Yards	Par
1	Cup	401	4	10	South America	406	4
2	Gulley	418	4	11	Dyke	352	4
3	Jockie's Burn	321	4	12	Southward Ho	467	4
4	Hillocks	365	4	13	Whins	135	3
5	Brae	363	4	14	Spectacles	473	5
6	Long ^	521	5	15	Lucky Slap	424	4
7	Plantation	376	4	16	Barry Burn	235	3
8	Short	146	3	17	Island	428	4
9	Railway	417	4	18	Home	453	5
Out		3,328	36	In		3,373	36
Source:				Total		6,701	72

^ The 6th hole was renamed Hogan's Alley in 2003

== Round summaries ==
=== First round ===
Wednesday, 3 June 1931

Place	Player	Score	To par
T1	(England) Henry Cotton	72	E
T1	(United States) Johnny Farrell	72	E
T1	(England) Bill Twine	72	E
4	(United States) Tommy Armour	73	+1
T5	(England) Percy Alliss	74	+2
T5	(France) Marcel Dallemagne	74	+2
T5	(England) Arthur Lacey	74	+2
T5	(England) Bill Large Sr.	74	+2
T5	(England) George Oke	74	+2
T5	(United States) Gene Sarazen	74	+2

=== Second round ===
Thursday, 4 June 1931

Place	Player	Score	To par
T1	(England) Henry Cotton	72-75=147	+3
T1	(Argentina) José Jurado	76-71=147	+3
3	(United States) Tommy Armour	73-75=148	+4
4	(United States) Johnny Farrell	72-77=149	+5
T5	(Australia) Joe Kirkwood Sr.	75-75=150	+6
T5	(United States) Gene Sarazen	74-76=150	+6
T5	(England) Bill Twine	72-78=150	+6
T8	(Argentina) Marcos Churio	76-75=151	+7
T8	(France) Marcel Dallemagne	74-77=151	+7
T8	(England) Arthur Havers	75-76=151	+7
T8	(United States) Willie Hunter	76-75=151	+7
T8	(England) Abe Mitchell	77-74=151	+7
T8	(England) Alf Perry	77-74=151	+7
T8	(England) Philip Rodgers	77-74=151	+7

=== Third round ===
Friday, 5 June 1931 (morning)

Place	Player	Score	To par
1	(Argentina) José Jurado	76-71-73=220	+4
T2	(England) Arthur Havers	75-76-72=223	+7
T2	(United States) Macdonald Smith	75-77-71=223	+7
T4	(United States) Johnny Farrell	72-77-75=224	+8
T4	(England) Reg Whitcombe	75-78-71=224	+8
T6	(England) Percy Alliss	74-78-73=225	+9
T6	(United States) Tommy Armour	73-75-77=225	+9
T6	(England) Bill Davies	76-78-71=225	+9
T6	(United States) Willie Hunter	76-75-74=225	+9
T6	(United States) Gene Sarazen	74-76-75=225	+9

=== Final round ===
Friday, 5 June 1931 (afternoon)

Place	Player	Score	To par	Money (£)
1	(United States) Tommy Armour	73-75-77-71=296	+8	100
2	(Argentina) José Jurado	76-71-73-77=297	+9	75
T3	(England) Percy Alliss	74-78-73-73=298	+10	40
T3	(United States) Gene Sarazen	74-76-75-73=298	+10	40
T5	(United States) Johnny Farrell	72-77-75-75=299	+11	22; 10s
T5	(United States) Macdonald Smith	75-77-71-76=299	+11	22; 10s
T7	(Argentina) Marcos Churio	76-75-78-71=300	+12	17; 10s
T7	(England) Bill Davies	76-78-71-75=300	+12	17; 10s
9	(England) Arthur Lacey	74-80-74-73=301	+13	15
T10	(England) Henry Cotton	72-75-79-76=302	+14	10
T10	(England) Arthur Havers	75-76-72-79=302	+14	10

Amateurs: McRuvie (+24), L. Hartley (+25), Bookless (+31), Burge (+31),
Sutton (+32), R. Hartley (+33), Shankland (+34), Tulloch (+34).
