= Vicente Fernández (golfer) =

Argentine golfer

Personal information
- Full name: Vicente Fernández
- Nationality: Argentina
- Born: 5 April 1946 (age 80) Corrientes, Argentina
- Height: 1.70 m (5 ft 7 in)

Career
- Sport: Golf
- Turned professional: 1964
- Current tour: Champions Tour
- Former tour: European Tour
- Professional wins: 72
- Highest ranking: 80 (28 February 1993)

Number of wins by tour
- European Tour: 4
- PGA Tour Champions: 4
- Other: 61 (regular); 3 (senior)

Best results in major championships
- Masters Tournament: DNP
- PGA Championship: DNP
- U.S. Open: DNP
- The Open Championship: T10: 1976

Vicente Fernández (born 5 April 1946) is an Argentine golfer who has won more than 60 professional tournaments around the world.

== Career ==
Fernández was born in Corrientes, Argentina. He turned professional in 1964 and was a regular competitor on the European Tour from the mid-1970s to the mid-1990s. He won four titles on the tour and had two top ten Order of Merit finishes, placing 6th in 1974 and 9th in 1975. He was sixteenth on the Order of Merit in 1992 at the age of 46.

As a senior Fernández moved to the United States to play on the Senior PGA Tour (now the Champions Tour), where he has won four tournaments. His other wins include eight victories in his national open championship, the Argentine Open.

== Professional wins (72) ==
=== European Tour wins (4) ===
No.	Date	Tournament	Winning score	Margin of victory	Runner(s)-up
1	16 Aug 1975	Benson & Hedges Festival of Golf	−18 (65-64-65-72=266)	1 stroke	(England) Maurice Bembridge
2	20 May 1979	Colgate PGA Championship	E (71-70-72-75=288)	1 stroke	(Italy) Baldovino Dassù, (South Africa) Gary Player
3	18 Mar 1990	Tenerife Open	−6 (67-74-72-69=282)	Playoff	(Wales) Mark Mouland
4	31 Aug 1992	Murphy's English Open	−5 (69-72-73-69=283)	1 stroke	(Sweden) Per-Ulrik Johansson, (Sweden) Fredrik Lindgren

European Tour playoff record (1–0)

No.	Year	Tournament	Opponent	Result
1	1990	Tenerife Open	(Wales) Mark Mouland	Won with par on third extra hole

=== Argentine wins (51) ===
- 1967 Argentine Masters, North Open
- 1968 Argentine Open
- 1969 Argentine Open
- 1970 Center Open, Abierto del Litoral, Norpatagonico Open, Acantilados Grand Prix
- 1971 Argentine Masters
- 1972 Abierto del Litoral
- 1973 Acantilados Grand Prix, Norpatagonico Open, Chaco Open
- 1974 Acantilados Grand Prix, Metropolitano Open, Chaco Open, Fultom Grand Prix, Hindu Club Grand Prix
- 1975 South Open, Rio Cuarto Open
- 1976 Argentine PGA Championship
- 1977 Acantilados Grand Prix
- 1978 Argentine PGA Championship, Abierto del Litoral, Argentino Golf Club Grand Prix, Ford Taunnus Grand Prix, Swift Grand Prix
- 1979 Pinamar Open
- 1980 Argentine PGA Championship, Abierto del Litoral, Hindu Club Match Play
- 1981 Argentine Open, Argentine PGA Championship, South Open, Acantilados Grand Prix
- 1982 Pinamar Open, Praderas Grand Prix (tie with Armando Saavedra)
- 1983 Ford Taunnus Grand Prix, Praderas Grand Prix
- 1984 Argentine Open, Acantilados Grand Prix, Praderas Grand Prix
- 1985 Argentine Open
- 1986 Argentine Open, South Open, Parana Open, Hindu Club Grand Prix
- 1987 Argentine PGA Championship
- 1990 Argentine Open
- 1999 Bariloche Match Play
- 2000 Argentine Open

=== Other wins (10) ===
- 1962 Argentine National Caddy's Tournament
- 1970 Dutch Open
- 1971 Santiago Open (Chile)
- 1972 Ford Maracaibo Open
- 1975 Uruguay Open
- 1977 Brazil Open
- 1982 El Rodeo Open (Colombia)
- 1983 Brazil Open
- 1984 Brazil Open
- 1994 Punta del Este Open (Uruguay)

=== Champions Tour wins (4) ===
No.	Date	Tournament	Winning score	Margin of victory	Runner(s)-up
1	21 Jul 1996	Burnet Senior Classic	−11 (69-68-68=205)	1 stroke	(Australia) Bruce Crampton, (United States) J. C. Snead
2	7 Sep 1997	Bank One Classic	−13 (67-69-67=203)	1 stroke	(Japan) Isao Aoki
3	16 May 1999	Las Vegas Senior Classic	−14 (69-71-67-67=274)	2 strokes	(United States) Dave Eichelberger
4	16 Feb 2003	ACE Group Classic	−14 (66-68-68=202)	3 strokes	(Republic of Ireland) Des Smyth, (United States) Tom Watson

=== Other senior wins (3) ===
- 1996 Argentine Senior PGA Championship
- 1999 Argentine Senior PGA Championship
- 2000 Chrysler Senior Match Play Challenge

== Results in major championships ==
Tournament	1971	1972	1973	1974	1975	1976	1977	1978	1979
The Open Championship	T25	T31	CUT	T37	T53	T10	T48		CUT

Tournament	1980	1981	1982	1983	1984	1985	1986	1987	1988	1989
The Open Championship	T45	CUT		T39	CUT	CUT	T21	CUT		CUT

Tournament	1990	1991	1992	1993
The Open Championship	T31			CUT

Note: Fernández only played in The Open Championship.

Top 10
Did not play

CUT = missed the half-way cut (3rd round cut in 1981 Open Championship)
"T" indicates a tie for a place

== Team appearances ==
- World Cup (representing Argentina): 1970, 1972, 1978, 1984, 1985
- Hennessy Cognac Cup (representing the Rest of the World): 1982
- Dunhill Cup (representing Argentina): 1986, 1989, 1990, 1993, 1995
- UBS Cup (representing the Rest of the World): 2003 (tie)

== See also ==
- Fall 1976 PGA Tour Qualifying School graduates
