= 2026 PGA Tour Americas =

Golf tour season

2026 PGA Tour Americas season
- Duration: April 16, 2026 – October 18, 2026
- Number of official events: 15
- Most wins: (Canada) Étienne Papineau (2) (Canada) Joey Savoie (2)
- Points list: (United States) Thomas Ponder

The 2026 PGA Tour Americas was the third season of PGA Tour Americas, a third-tier tour operated and run by the PGA Tour.

== Schedule ==
The following table lists official events during the 2026 season.

Date	Tournament	Host country	Purse (US$)	Winner (Note: The number in parentheses after each winner's name is the number of PGA Tour Americas events they had won up to and including that tournament. It is rare for someone to accumulate many wins on PGA Tour Americas as success at this level usually leads to promotion to the Korn Ferry Tour.)	OWGR points
Apr 19	ECP Brazil Open	Brazil	225,000	(United States) Mason Greene (1)	7.68
Apr 26	Abierto del Centro Zurich	Argentina	225,000	(United States) Patrick Flavin (1)	8.13
May 17	Diners Club Peru Open	Peru	225,000	(United States) Cole Anderson (1)	7.57
May 24	Kia Open de Ecuador	Ecuador	225,000	(Canada) Joey Savoie (1)	8.05
Jun 7	Mexico Championship	Mexico	225,000	(United States) Corey Pereira (1)	7.67
Jun 14	Inter Rapidisimo Golf Championship	Colombia	225,000	(United States) Drew Doyle (1)	8.23
Jun 28	Blue Cross and Blue Shield of Kansas Wichita Open	United States	225,000	(United States) Dawson Armstrong (1)	8.82
Jul 12	Explore NB Open	Canada	225,000	(United States) Thomas Ponder (1)	8.66
Jul 19	Commissionaires Ottawa Open	Canada	225,000	(Argentina) Mateo Fernández de Oliveira (1)	8.71
Jul 26	Osprey Valley Open	Canada	225,000	(Canada) Étienne Papineau (1)	9.11
Aug 23	Manitoba Open	Canada	225,000	(Sweden) Daniel Svärd (1)	9.15
Aug 30	CRMC Championship	United States	225,000	(United States) Justin Biwer (1)	9.32
Sep 13	Digital Commerce Group Open	Canada	225,000	(Canada) Étienne Papineau (2)	9.24
Sep 20	ATB Classic	Canada	225,000	(England) Charlie Crockett (1)	9.20
Oct 18	Dominican Republic Tour Championship	Dominican Republic	225,000	(Canada) Joey Savoie (2)	5.64

== Points list ==
The points list was based on tournament results during the season, calculated using a points-based system. The top 10 players on the points list earned status to play on the 2027 Korn Ferry Tour.

Position	Player	Points
1	(United States) Thomas Ponder	1,566
2	(United States) Corey Pereira	1,450
3	(Canada) Étienne Papineau	1,443
4	(Canada) Joey Savoie	1,290
5	(United States) Patrick Flavin	1,257
6	(England) Charlie Crockett	1,176
7	(United States) Justin Biwer	1,035
8	(United States) Jack Lundin	979
9	(United States) Charlie Nikitas	978
10	(United States) Patrick Sheehan	816
