= Center Open =

Abierto del Centro
Tournament information
- Location: Córdoba, Argentina
- Established: 1927
- Course: Córdoba Golf Club
- Par: 71
- Length: 6,878 yards (6,289 m)
- Tours: Challenge Tour; PGA Tour Latinoamérica; Tour de las Américas; TPG Tour
- Format: Stroke play
- Prize fund: AR$8,000,000
- Month played: April

Tournament record score
- Aggregate: 268 Ryan Grider (2025); 268 Joey Vrzich (2025)
- To par: −16 as above

Current champion
- (United States) Ryan Grider

Final champion
- Location in Argentina

The Center Open, or Abierto del Centro, is one of the major regional open golf tournaments in Argentina. Founded in 1927, it has always been held at the Córdoba Golf Club in Córdoba.

In 2001, Ángel Cabrera set the course record of 60 in the final round, and also equalled the tournament record aggregate score of 270, set by Ángel Franco in 1992. Roberto De Vicenzo won seven titles between 1943 and 1974.

The 2022 event, played on PGA Tour Latinoamérica in April, was renamed in memory of Eduardo Romero; who had died in February earlier that year.

== Winners ==
Year	Tour(s) (Note: ARG − PGA of Argentina Tour; CHA − Challenge Tour; PGATAM − PGA Tour Americas; PGATLA − PGA Tour Latinoamérica; TLA − Tour de las Américas; TPG − TPG Tour.)	Winner	Score	To par	Margin of victory	Runner(s)-up
Abierto del Centro Zurich
2026	PGATAM	(United States) Patrick Flavin	267	−17	2 strokes	(United States) Patrick Sheehan
Abierto del Centro
2025	PGATAM	(United States) Ryan Grider	268	−16	Playoff	(United States) Joey Vrzich
2024	TPG	(Argentina) Ignacio Marino	280	−4	2 strokes	(Argentina) Jorge Fernández-Valdés (Argentina) Maximiliano Godoy
2023	TPG	(Argentina) Nelson Ledesma	270	−14	1 stroke	(Argentina) Ignacio Marino
2022	PGATLA	(Argentina) Alejandro Tosti	274	−10	8 strokes	(Argentina) Clodomiro Carranza
Abierto OSDE del Centro
2021	TPG	(Argentina) César Costilla (2)	274	−10	4 strokes	(Argentina) Nelson Ledesma
2020	PGATLA	No tournament due to the COVID-19 pandemic				
2019	PGATLA	(United States) Tom Whitney	270	−14	1 stroke	(United States) Nicolo Galletti
2018	PGATLA	(Chile) Cristóbal del Solar	272	−12	5 strokes	(United States) M. J. Maguire (Colombia) Marcelo Rozo
2017	PGATLA	(Argentina) Nelson Ledesma	275	−9	3 strokes	(United States) Hank Lebioda (Argentina) Paulo Pinto
2016	PGATLA	(United States) Anthony Paolucci	276	−8	4 strokes	(United States) Joe Affrunti (United States) Case Cochran (United States) John Kim (United States) Charlie Saxon (United States) Eric Steger (Venezuela) Felipe Velazquez
2015	PGATLA	(Argentina) Tommy Cocha	275	−9	4 strokes	(Argentina) Ángel Cabrera (United States) Steven Fox
2014	PGATLA	(United States) William Kropp	276	−8	1 stroke	(Argentina) Ángel Cabrera
2013	PGATLA	(Argentina) Ángel Cabrera (8)	284	E	Playoff	(Argentina) Rafael Gómez
2012	TLA, TPG	(Argentina) César Costilla	280	−4	1 stroke	(Argentina) César Monasterio
2011	TLA, TPG	(Paraguay) Héctor Céspedes	279	−5	Playoff	(Argentina) Joaquín Estévez
Abierto del Centro
2010	TLA, TPG	(Argentina) Andrés Romero	274	−10	4 strokes	(Argentina) Ángel Cabrera
2009	TLA, TPG	(Argentina) Fabián Gómez	273	−11	4 strokes	(Argentina) Ricardo González
Abierto Visa del Centro
2008	CHA, TLA, TPG	(Argentina) Estanislao Goya	272	−12	Playoff	(England) Gary Boyd
2007	TLA, TPG	(Argentina) Ángel Cabrera (7)	279	−5	2 strokes	(Paraguay) Raúl Fretes
2006	ARG, TLA	(Argentina) Ángel Cabrera (6)	275	−9	Playoff	(Argentina) Eduardo Romero
Abierto del Centro
2005		(Argentina) Ángel Cabrera (5)	276	−8		(Argentina) Andrés Romero
2004		(Paraguay) Carlos Franco	273	−11		(Argentina) Andrés Romero
2003		(Argentina) Ariel Cañete	273	−11		(Argentina) Daniel Vancsik
2002: No tournament
2001		(Argentina) Ángel Cabrera (4)	270			(Argentina) Eduardo Romero
2000		(Argentina) Ángel Cabrera (3)	275			(Argentina) Ricardo González (Argentina) Rafael Gómez
1999		(Argentina) Eduardo Romero (7)	272			(Sweden) Henrik Stenson
1998		(Sweden) Joakim Haeggman	276			(United States) Dudley Hart
1997		(Argentina) Ángel Cabrera (2)	272			(Argentina) Eduardo Romero
1996		(Argentina) Eduardo Romero (6)	204			(Argentina) Ángel Cabrera
1995		(Argentina) Eduardo Romero (5)	279			
1994		(Argentina) Ángel Cabrera	277			(Argentina) Eduardo Romero (Argentina) Armando Saavedra
1993		(Argentina) Jorge Berendt	272			(Argentina) Ángel Cabrera (United States) Kirk Triplett
1992		(Paraguay) Ángel Franco	270			
1991		(Argentina) Eduardo Romero (4)	280			(Argentina) Jorge Soto
1990		(Argentina) Eduardo Romero (3)	279			
1989		(Argentina) Jorge Soto	279			(Argentina) José Cóceres
1988		(Argentina) Eduardo Romero (2)	274			(Argentina) Adan Sowa
1987		(Argentina) Miguel Fernández	278			(Argentina) Luis Carbonetti
1986		(Argentina) Luis Carbonetti (3)	285			
1985		(Argentina) Luis Carbonetti (2)	281			(Argentina) Armando Saavedra
1984		(Argentina) Eduardo Romero	276			(Argentina) Armando Saavedra
1983		(Argentina) Luis Carbonetti (a)	282			(Argentina) Eduardo Romero
1982		(Argentina) Adan Sowa	284			(Argentina) Florentino Molina
1981		(Argentina) Florentino Molina (2)	286			
1980		(United States) Andy North	277			(Argentina) Luis Carbonetti (a)
1978–79: No tournament
1977		(Argentina) Juan Carlos Molina (2)	291			(Argentina) Juan Quinteros (Argentina) Roberto Monguzzi (a)
1976: No tournament
1975		(Argentina) Juan Carlos Molina	284			(Argentina) Jorge Soto
1974		(Argentina) Roberto De Vicenzo (7)	280			(Argentina) Jorge Soto
1973		(Argentina) Roberto De Vicenzo (6)	284			
1972		(Argentina) Roberto De Vicenzo (5)	285			
1971		(Argentina) Florentino Molina	280			(Argentina) Juan Carlos Cabrera
1970		(Argentina) Vicente Fernández	277			
1969		(Argentina) Orlando Tudino	284			(Argentina) Carlos Ordoñes
1968		(Argentina) Fidel de Luca (2)	277			(Argentina) Roberto Monguzzi (a)
1967		(Argentina) Roberto De Vicenzo (4)	283			
1966		(Argentina) Leopoldo Ruiz (4)	283			
1965		(Argentina) Roberto De Vicenzo (3)	283			
1964		(Argentina) Leopoldo Ruiz (3)	293			
1963		(Argentina) Juan Quinteros	288			
1962		(Argentina) Roberto De Vicenzo (2)	290			(Argentina) Angel Monguzzi (a)
1961		(Argentina) Leopoldo Ruiz (2)	279			
1960		(Argentina) Leopoldo Ruiz	287			
1959		(Argentina) Enrique Bertolino (3)	282			
1958		(Argentina) Fidel de Luca	279			
1957		(Argentina) Juan Das Neves	291			
1956		(Argentina) Martin Pose (8)	284			(Argentina) Leopoldo Ruiz
1955		(Argentina) Antonio Cerdá (3)	288			(Argentina) Arturo Soto
1954		(Argentina) Martin Pose (7)	280			(Argentina) Roberto De Vicenzo
1953		(Argentina) Antonio Cerdá (2)	278			(Argentina) Juan Segura (a)
1952		(Argentina) Antonio Cerdá	288			(Argentina) Enrique Bertolino
1951		(Argentina) Enrique Bertolino (3)	282			(Argentina) Sebastian Nicolosi
1950		(Argentina) Martin Pose (6)	287			(Argentina) Antonio Cerdá
1949		(Argentina) Enrique Bertolino (2)	287			(Argentina) Juan Anzaldo
1948		(Argentina) Eduardo Blasi (2)	295			(Argentina) Arturo Soto
1947		(Argentina) Martin Pose (5)	283			(Argentina) Leonardo Nicolosi
1946		(Argentina) Martin Pose (4)	288			
1945		(Argentina) Leonardo Nicolosi	283			
1944		(Argentina) Martin Pose (3)	290			
1943		(Argentina) Roberto De Vicenzo	285			
1942		(Argentina) Eduardo Blasi	288			
1941		(United States) Sam Snead	280			(United States) Jimmy Demaret
1940		(Argentina) Ernesto Caserio	288			
1939		(Argentina) Martin Pose (2)	276			
1938		(Argentina) Juan Martínez	286			
1937		(Argentina) Emilio Dunazet	292			
1936		(Argentina) José Jurado	282			
1935		(Argentina) Emilio Serra (3)	284			
1934		(Argentina) Emilio Serra (2)	289			(Argentina) Marcos Churio
1933		(Argentina) Martin Pose	282			(Argentina) Marcos Churio
1932		(Argentina) Emilio Serra	289			(Argentina) Armando Blasi
1931		(Argentina) Marcos Churio	277			
1930		(Scotland) Fred Robertson	294			(Argentina) Hector Bozzachi
1929		(Argentina) José Jurado	284			(England) George Gadd (Argentina) Pedro Churio
1928: No tournament
1927		(Argentina) Hector Bozzachi	300			(Argentina) José Jurado
