= José Jurado =

Argentine golfer

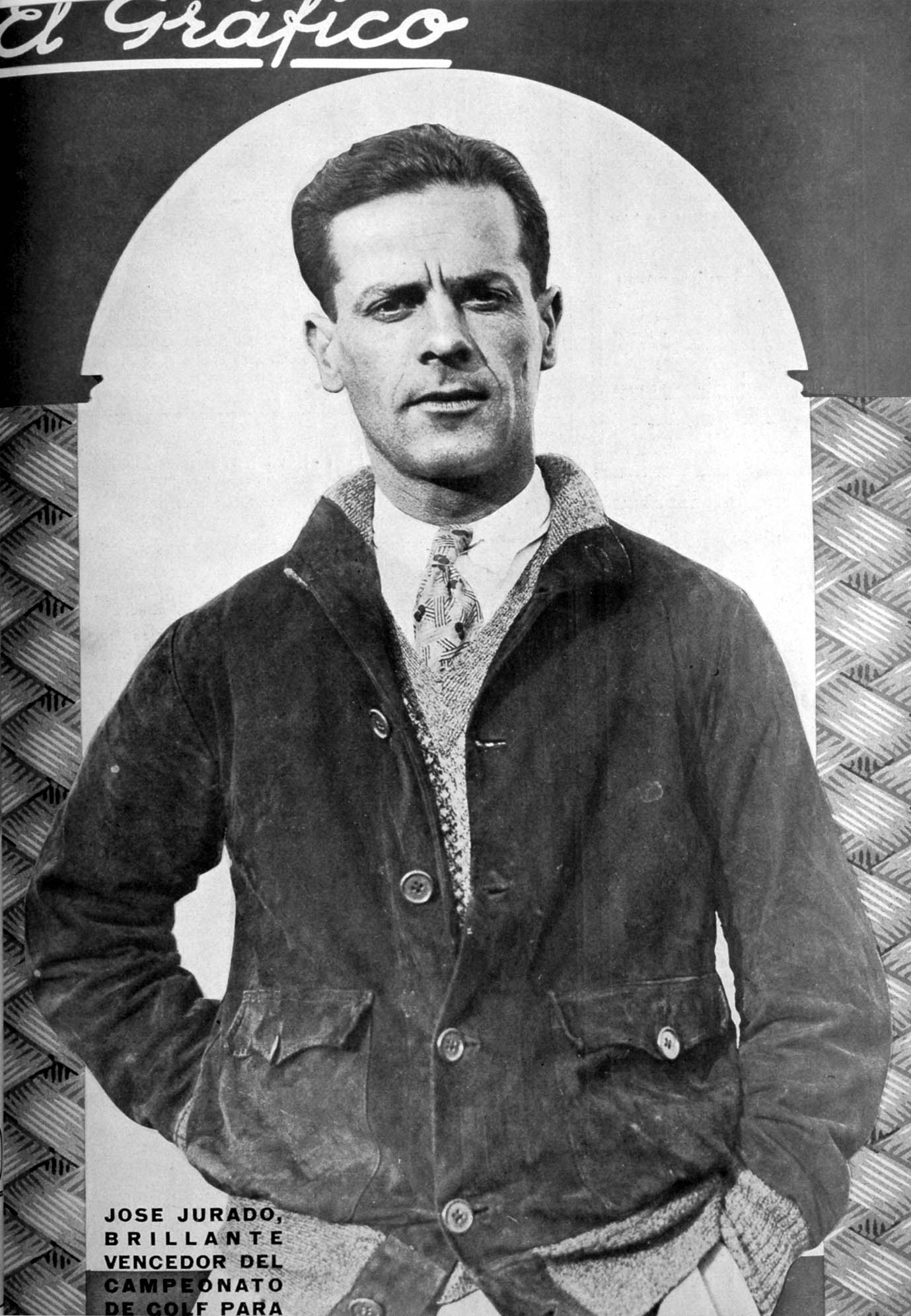
Jurado in 1927, as portrayed on the cover of El Gráfico

José Jurado (1899–1971) was a professional golfer. He was the first Argentine to travel to major international championships and is thus often credited as the “Father of Argentine Professional Golf” or the “Godfather of Argentinean Golf.” He is perhaps best known for his losing stroke to Tommy Armour at the 1931 Open Championship at Carnoustie.

== Career ==
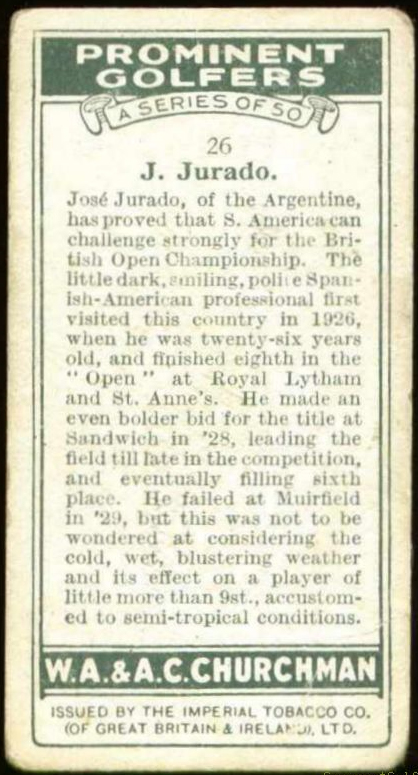
Backside of a José Jurado tobacco card, manufactured in 1931

In 1899, Jurado was born in Villa Ballester, northern suburb of Buenos Aires. Jurado began his career as a caddie at San Andrés Golf Club, located in General San Martín Partido, Province of Buenos Aires.

At the age of 21, he won his first of seven championships at the Argentine Open, and was also a seven-time winner of the Argentine PGA Championship. In 1932, Jurado traveled to the US, justifying these journeys as the only way to progress his skill as a professional golfer. After studying the operations of the American PGA, he undertook the organization of the AAPG (Asociación Argentina de Profesionales de Golf). Jurado also recruited international golf figures to teach Argentine enthusiasts the emerging and popular American-style swing.

In 1931, he won an exhibition match against Aubrey Boomer in France. Jurado finished in the top ten in four majors: T8 at the British Open in 1926, T6 in the British Open in 1928, 2nd in the British Open in 1931, and 6th in the U.S. Open in 1932. Jurado was personal friends with the Prince of Wales, who was reportedly enraged by his double bogey that lost him the 1931 Open Championship.

== In literature ==
Jurado is referenced in The Book of Golfers: A Biographical History of the Royal & Ancient Game, by Daniel Wexler. The book is an encyclopedia of the most important golfers since the 15th century, and in it Jurado is described as “... a golfing pioneer in the truest sense, for while early British professionals ventured out to parts unknown with the psychological might of the world’s biggest empire (both golfing and otherwise) behind them, Jurado traveled thousands of miles to challenge the British golf monolith on its own turf.”

Jurado is also referenced in the 2005 biography Sir Walter: Walter Hagen and the Invention of Professional Golf, by Thomas Clavin. The biography details the life and career of Walter Hagen, who won eleven major professional golf tournaments over his career. In the book, Jurado is described as having “demonstrated the tango” to a group of 1933 Ryder Cup golfers at a dancehall in Southport, UK. Jurado, who was there for the British Open, apparently “won the (dance) contest”.

== Professional wins ==
this list may be incomplete

- 1920 Argentine Open
- 1921 Argentine PGA Championship
- 1922 Argentine PGA Championship
- 1924 Argentine Open, South Open
- 1925 Argentine Open, Argentine PGA Championship, South Open
- 1927 Argentine Open, Argentine PGA Championship
- 1928 Argentine Open, Argentine PGA Championship
- 1929 Argentine Open, Argentine PGA Championship, Center Open
- 1931 Argentine Open
- 1932 South Open
- 1933 South Open
- 1936 Center Open
- 1937 Argentine PGA Championship
- 1938 Palermo Masters

== Results in major championships ==
Tournament	1926	1927	1928	1929	1930	1931	1932
U.S. Open							6
The Open Championship	T8		T6	T25		2	

Note: Jurado never played in the Masters Tournament nor the PGA Championship.

Top 10
Did not play

"T" indicates a tie for a place

== Team appearances ==
- Great Britain–Argentina Professional Match (representing Argentina): 1939 (captain)

== Suggested reading ==
- The Book of Golfers: A Biographical History of the Royal & Ancient Game, by Daniel Wexler (Ann Arbor Media Group, 2005) ISBN 1-58726-190-1, ISBN 978-1-58726-190-9
- Sir Walter: Walter Hagen and the Invention of Professional Golf, by Thomas Clavin (Simon and Schuster, 2005) ISBN 0-7432-0486-7, ISBN 978-0-7432-0486-6
