= Eduardo Romero =

Argentine professional golfer (1954–2022)

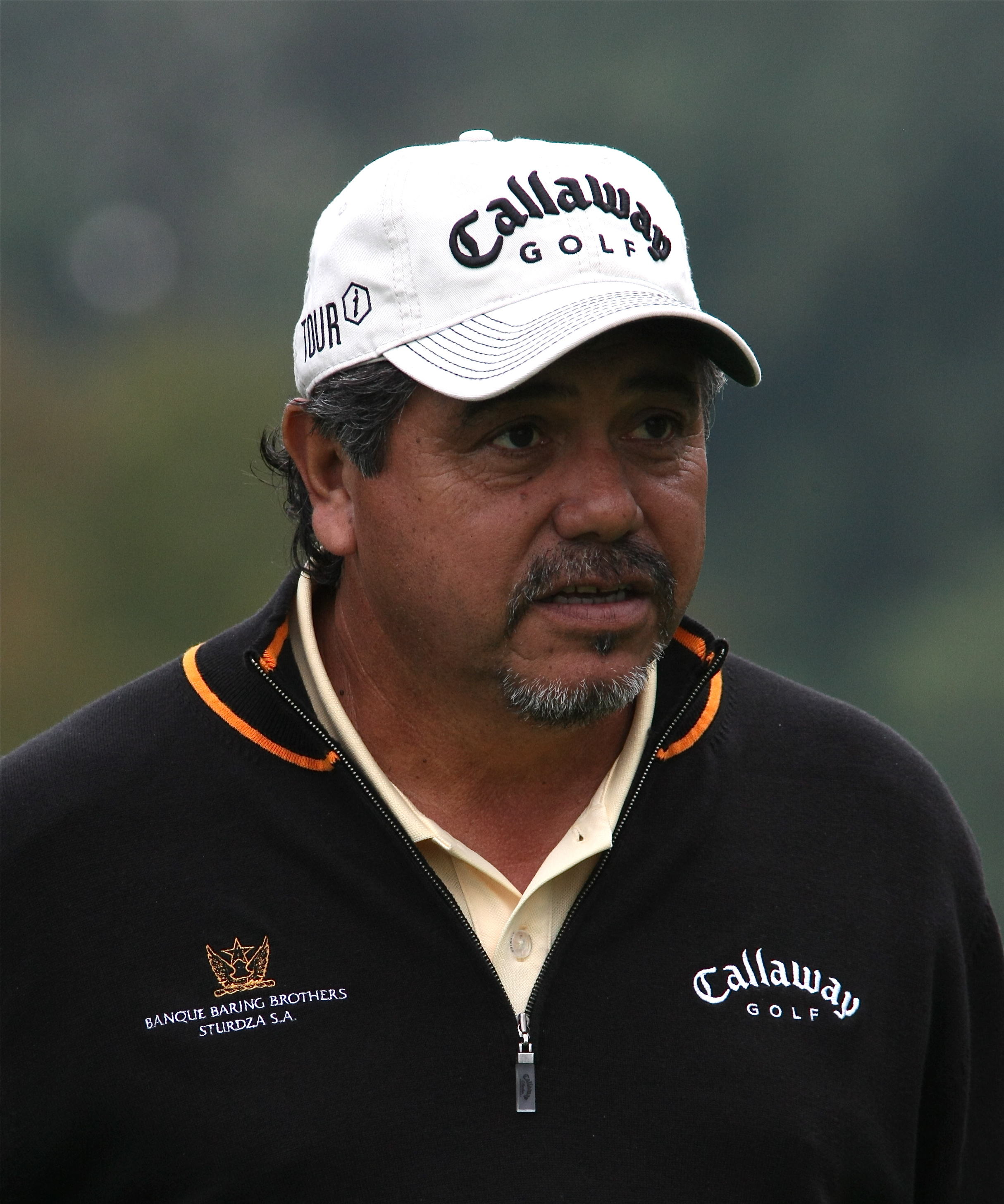
- Romero in 2008

Personal information
- Full name: Eduardo Alejandro Romero
- Nickname: El Gato (The Cat)
- Nationality: Argentina
- Born: 17 July 1954 Córdoba, Argentina
- Died: 13 February 2022 (aged 67) Villa Allende, Córdoba Province, Argentina
- Height: 6 ft 2 in (1.88 m)
- Weight: 210 lb (95 kg; 15 st)
- Spouse: Adriana (m. 1978)
- Children: 1

Career
- Sport: Golf
- Turned professional: 1982
- Former tours: PGA Tour; European Tour; PGA Tour Champions; European Seniors Tour
- Professional wins: 75
- Highest ranking: 19 (7 July 1991)

Number of wins by tour
- European Tour: 8
- PGA Tour Champions: 5
- European Senior Tour: 3
- Other: 60

Best results in major championships
- Masters Tournament: 39th: 2004
- PGA Championship: T20: 1993
- U.S. Open: T15: 2003
- The Open Championship: T7: 1997

Achievements and awards
- Champions Tour Rookie of the Year: 2006

Eduardo Alejandro Romero (17 July 1954 – 13 February 2022) was an Argentine professional golfer. Nicknamed "El Gato" ("The Cat"), he won over 80 professional tournaments around the world, including eight on the European Tour and five on the Champions Tour, with two senior majors; he also won over 50 times in South America and was a member of the Argentine team at the World Cup on 14 occasions.

== Career ==
Romero was born in Córdoba to a family of modest means.

Romero turned professional in 1982. He played extensively in Latin America on the Tour de las Americas and its predecessor the "South American Tour", but his international profile is mainly based on his success on the more prestigious European Tour and in senior golf in the United States and Europe. He reached the top 20 of the Official World Golf Ranking.

He first played on the European Tour in 1985 and was a full member from 1988 to 2005. He had 8 tournament victories and seven top twenty placings on the Order of Merit. In 2002 he became the third oldest winner on the European Tour (behind Des Smyth and Neil Coles) when he won the Scottish Open just three days before his 48th birthday. Romero came fifth on the Order of Merit for 2002. Romero turned fifty in 2004, and just a few days later he finished in a tie for second at his first senior tournament, the Senior British Open. In 2005 he won his first senior title at the European Seniors Tour's Travis Perkins Senior Masters, and he won the Wentworth Senior Masters in both 2005 and 2006. In 2006, he lost in a playoff against Loren Roberts for the Senior British Open Championship and won a playoff against Lonnie Nielsen for the JELD-WEN Tradition for his first Champions Tour win and major. He was the Champions Tour's 2006 Rookie of the Year. He won the U.S. Senior Open, his second major, at The Broadmoor in Colorado Springs in 2008.

Romero won more than eighty tournaments in Latin America. He represented Argentina in the World Cup and the Alfred Dunhill Cup numerous times, and he participated in the UBS Cup in 2002 and 2003. He also appeared on The Golf Channel's The Big Break series.

Romero's nickname was "El Gato" ("The Cat").

== Death ==
Romero died on 13 February 2022, at the age of 67 at his home in Villa Allende, Córdoba Province, Argentina. The Abierto del Centro, played on the PGA Tour Latinoamérica in April 2022, was renamed in memory of Romero.

== Professional wins (75) ==
=== European Tour wins (8) ===
No.	Date	Tournament	Winning score	Margin of victory	Runner(s)-up
1	17 Sep 1989	Trophée Lancôme	−22 (69-65-66-66=266)	1 stroke	(West Germany) Bernhard Langer, (Spain) José María Olazábal
2	25 Mar 1990	Volvo Open di Firenze	−23 (68-66-64-67=265)	1 stroke	(England) Russell Claydon, (Scotland) Colin Montgomerie
3	12 May 1991	Peugeot Spanish Open	−13 (68-63-72-72=275)	Playoff	(Spain) Seve Ballesteros
4	30 Jun 1991	Peugeot Open de France	−7 (69-69-67-76=281)	2 strokes	(Spain) José María Olazábal, (Scotland) Sam Torrance
5	22 May 1994	Tisettanta Italian Open	−16 (69-67-69-67=272)	1 stroke	(New Zealand) Greg Turner
6	4 Sep 1994	Canon European Masters	−22 (64-68-66-68=266)	1 stroke	(Sweden) Pierre Fulke
7	10 Sep 2000	Canon European Masters (2)	−23 (64-68-62-67=261)	10 strokes	(Denmark) Thomas Bjørn
8	14 Jul 2002	Barclays Scottish Open	−11 (72-66-65-70=273)	Playoff	(Sweden) Freddie Jacobson

European Tour playoff record (2–1)

No.	Year	Tournament	Opponent	Result
1	1991	Peugeot Spanish Open	(Spain) Seve Ballesteros	Won with birdie on seventh extra hole
2	2002	Barclays Scottish Open	(Sweden) Freddie Jacobson	Won with birdie on first extra hole
3	2002	Dunhill Links Championship	(Republic of Ireland) Pádraig Harrington	Lost to birdie on second extra hole

=== Argentine Tour wins (44) ===
This list is incomplete

- 1983 (3) Argentine PGA Championship, La Cumbre Open, Highland Grand Prix
- 1984 (8) Carilo Open, Abierto del Litoral, La Cumbre Open, Center Open, San Martin Grand Prix, Chaco Open, Ituzaingo Grand Prix, Jockey Club Rosario Open
- 1986 (1) Argentine PGA Championship
- 1987 (4) Sevel Grand Prix, North Open, Los Cardales Grand Prix, American Express Grand Prix
- 1988 (4) South Open, Punta del Este Open (Uruguay), Center Open, Norpatagonico Open
- 1989 (3) Argentine Open, Sevel Grand Prix, Los Lagartos Grand Prix
- 1990 (2) Argentine PGA Championship, Center Open
- 1991 (3) Acantilados Grand Prix, Center Open, North Open (tie with Adan Sowa)
- 1992 (3) Argentine PGA Championship, South Open, North Open
- 1993 (1) Argentine PGA Championship
- 1994 (1) North Open
- 1995 (2) Punta del Este Open (Uruguay), Center Open
- 1996 (2) Argentine PGA Championship, Center Open
- 1997 (2) Argentine PGA Championship, Las Delicias Open
- 1998 (2) Acantilados Grand Prix, North Open
- 1999 (3) Argentine PGA Championship, Center Open, La Cumbre Open

=== Córdoba Tour wins (5) ===
- 1982 (4) Center Cuyo Tournament, Bell Ville Tournament, Córdoba PGA Championship, La Cumbre Tournament
- 1984 (1) Bell Ville Tournament

=== Other wins (11) ===
- 1980 Argentine Caddie's Tournament (as an amateur)
- 1984 Chile Open
- 1987 Sierra de la Ventana Tournament (Arg), South American team (Arg), Prince of Wales Open (Chile), Santo Domingo Open (Chile), Sports Frances Open (Chile)
- 1997 Las Brisas Open (Chile)
- 1998 Mexican Open, Las Brisas Open (Chile)
- 2000 Desafio de Maestros (Arg)

=== Champions Tour wins (5) ===
Legend
Champions Tour major championships (2)
Other Champions Tour (3)

No.	Date	Tournament	Winning score	Margin of victory	Runner(s)-up
1	27 Aug 2006	JELD-WEN Tradition	−13 (72-70-68-65=275)	Playoff	(United States) Lonnie Nielsen
2	6 Jul 2008	Dick's Sporting Goods Open	−17 (65-65-69=199)	1 stroke	(South Africa) Fulton Allem, (United States) Gary Koch
3	3 Aug 2008	U.S. Senior Open	−6 (67-69-65-73=274)	4 strokes	(United States) Fred Funk
4	28 Sep 2008	SAS Championship	−15 (68-67-66=201)	3 strokes	(United States) Tom Kite
5	8 Mar 2009	Toshiba Classic	−11 (66-68-68=202)	1 stroke	(United States) Mark O'Meara, (United States) Joey Sindelar

Champions Tour playoff record (1–1)

No.	Year	Tournament	Opponent	Result
1	2006	The Senior British Open Championship	(United States) Loren Roberts	Lost to par on first extra hole
2	2006	JELD-WEN Tradition	(United States) Lonnie Nielsen	Won with birdie on first extra hole

=== European Seniors Tour wins (3) ===
Legend
Senior major championships (1)
Other European Seniors Tour (2)

No.	Date	Tournament	Winning score	Margin of victory	Runner(s)-up
1	21 Aug 2005	Travis Perkins Senior Masters	−11 (70-67-68=205)	8 strokes	(Argentina) Luis Carbonetti, (England) Nick Job
2	6 Aug 2006	Wentworth Senior Masters (2)	−9 (71-66-70=207)	2 strokes	(Argentina) Horacio Carbonetti, (Scotland) Sam Torrance
3	3 Aug 2008	U.S. Senior Open	−6 (67-69-65-73=274)	4 strokes	(United States) Fred Funk

European Seniors Tour playoff record (0–1)

No.	Year	Tournament	Opponent	Result
1	2006	The Senior British Open Championship	(United States) Loren Roberts	Lost to par on first extra hole

== Results in major championships ==
Tournament	1985	1986	1987	1988	1989
Masters Tournament					
U.S. Open					
The Open Championship	CUT			T13	T8
PGA Championship					

Tournament	1990	1991	1992	1993	1994	1995	1996	1997	1998	1999
Masters Tournament										
U.S. Open			CUT			T51			T25	
The Open Championship	T53	T26	CUT	CUT	CUT	T88	T33	T7	T57	
PGA Championship	CUT	T52	CUT	T20				T41	CUT	CUT

Tournament	2000	2001	2002	2003	2004	2005	2006	2007	2008	2009
Masters Tournament		CUT		CUT	39					
U.S. Open		51		T15	CUT					CUT
The Open Championship	35	T25	CUT	CUT	CUT					
PGA Championship	CUT	CUT	CUT	T61	T55					

Top 10
Did not play

CUT = missed the half-way cut
"T" = tied

=== Summary ===
Tournament	Wins	2nd	3rd	Top-5	Top-10	Top-25	Events	Cuts made
Masters Tournament	0	0	0	0	0	0	3	1
U.S. Open	0	0	0	0	0	2	7	4
The Open Championship	0	0	0	0	2	4	17	10
PGA Championship	0	0	0	0	0	1	12	5
Totals	0	0	0	0	2	7	39	20

- Most consecutive cuts made – 7 (1995 U.S. Open – 1998 Open Championship)
- Longest streak of top-10s – 1 (twice)

== Results in The Players Championship ==
Tournament	2001	2002	2003
The Players Championship	CUT		CUT

Did not play

CUT = missed the halfway cut

== Results in World Golf Championships ==
Tournament	1999	2000	2001	2002	2003	2004
Match Play	QF				R32	R64
Championship		T25	NT^{1}	T36	T25	
Invitational				T47	T33	

^{1}Cancelled due to 9/11

Top 10
Did not play

QF, R16, R32, R64 = Round in which player lost in match play
"T" = Tied
NT = No tournament

== Champions Tour major championships ==
=== Wins (2) ===
Year	Championship	Winning score	Margin	Runner-up
2006	JELD-WEN Tradition	−13 (72-70-68-65=275)	Playoff	(United States) Lonnie Nielsen
2008	U.S. Senior Open	−6 (67-69-65-73=274)	4 strokes	(United States) Fred Funk

=== Results timeline ===
Results not in chronological order before 2016.

Tournament	2004	2005	2006	2007	2008	2009	2010	2011	2012	2013	2014	2015	2016
The Tradition			1	T14	T18	T11	T18	T5	T38				
Senior PGA Championship	–		T31	2	T16	T14	T18	T5	CUT	CUT			
Senior Players Championship	–			T7	T7	T31	T33	T40	T71				
Senior British Open Championship	T2	T9	2	T4	3	T38	T18	T49	T40	T48	CUT		
U.S. Senior Open				T22	1	T19	T28	CUT	CUT	T61		CUT	CUT

Win
Top 10
Did not play

CUT = missed the halfway cut
"T" indicates a tie for a place

== Team appearances ==
this list in incomplete

- World Cup (representing Argentina): 1983, 1984, 1987, 1988, 1991, 1993, 1994, 1995, 1999, 2000, 2001, 2002, 2003, 2004
- Alfred Dunhill Cup (representing Argentina): 1989, 1990, 1993, 1995, 1997, 1998, 2000
- UBS Cup (representing the Rest of the World): 2002, 2003 (tie)

== See also ==
- 1985 PGA Tour Qualifying School graduates
- 1994 PGA Tour Qualifying School graduates
- List of golfers with most European Tour wins

Awards
Preceded by (Argentina) Gabriela Sabatini	Olimpia de Oro; 1989	Succeeded by (Argentina) Pedro Décima
