= Martin Pose =

Argentine golfer (1911–1977)

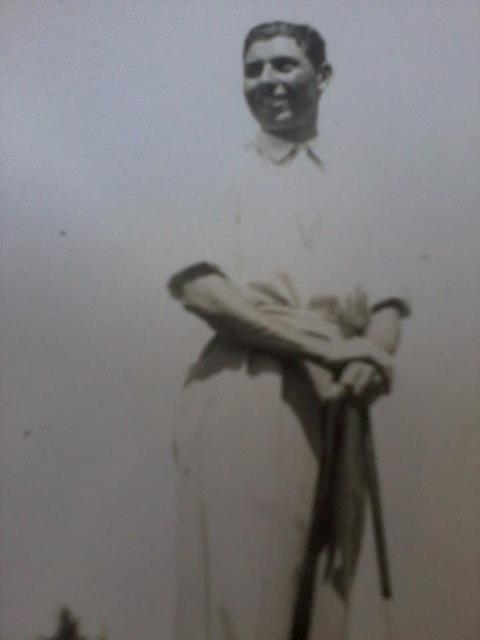

Personal information
- Full name: Martin Pose
- Nationality: Argentina
- Born: 13 February 1911 Mar del Plata, Argentina
- Died: 1997

Career
- Sport: Golf
- Turned professional: 1930
- Professional wins: 29

Best results in major championships
- Masters Tournament: T29: 1941
- PGA Championship: DNP
- U.S. Open: CUT: 1940
- The Open Championship: 8th: 1939

Martin Pose (13 February 1911 – 1997) was an Argentine professional golfer.

== Career ==
Pose was born in Mar del Plata. He turned professional in 1930, and competed in Europe in 1939 and 1956; and on the PGA Tour in 1940 and 1948. His best finish on the PGA Tour was 9th place in the Bing Crosby Pro-Am in 1948. In 1939, he was 8th in the British Open. In 1940, along with Enrique Bertolino, he was the first Argentine player to compete in the Masters Tournament. He also played in the U.S. Open the same year.

In 1936, Pose won an exhibition match against Johnny Revolta in Buenos Aires. He was the first Argentine player to win a European tournament, the French Open 1939.

Pose finished second in Brazil Open in 1953, Argentine Open in 1938 and the Argentine PGA Championship in 1935, 1937 and 1945.

== Professional wins (29) ==
- 1931 Ituzaingo Grand Prix
- 1933 Center Open, Argentine Open
- 1934 South Open
- 1935 South Open
- 1936 Argentine PGA Championship
- 1937 Abierto del Litoral
- 1938 South Open
- 1939 Center Open, Argentine Open, French Open
- 1940 Abierto del Litoral, South Open
- 1942 Argentine PGA Championship
- 1944 Center Open
- 1945 Abierto del Litoral, Brazil Open
- 1946 Center Open
- 1947 Center Open, Swift Grand Prix
- 1949 South Open
- 1950 Center Open, Argentine Open
- 1954 Center Open, Argentine PGA Championship, Uruguay Open
- 1955 Juan Dentone Cup, Argentine PGA Championship
- 1956 Center Open

== Team appearances ==
- Great Britain–Argentina Professional Match (representing Argentina): 1939
- World Cup (representing Argentina): 1956
