= Roberto De Vicenzo =

Argentine professional golfer (1923–2017)

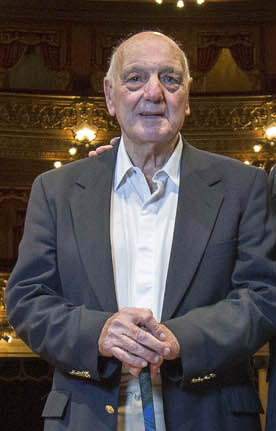
- De Vicenzo in 2013

Personal information
- Nationality: Argentina
- Born: 14 April 1923 Villa Ballester, Argentina
- Died: 1 June 2017 (aged 94) Ranelagh, Argentina

Career
- Sport: Golf
- Turned professional: 1938
- Former tours: PGA Tour; Senior PGA Tour
- Professional wins: 229

Number of wins by tour
- PGA Tour: 5
- PGA Tour Champions: 2
- Other: 222

Best results in major championships (wins: 1)
- Masters Tournament: 2nd: 1968
- PGA Championship: T5: 1954
- U.S. Open: T8: 1958
- The Open Championship: Won: 1967

Achievements and awards
- World Golf Hall of Fame: 1989 (member page)
- Bob Jones Award: 1970
- Olimpia Award: 1967, 1970

Roberto De Vicenzo (14 April 1923 – 1 June 2017) was a professional golfer from Argentina. He won a record 229 professional tournaments worldwide during his career, including seven on the PGA Tour and most famously the 1967 Open Championship. He is also remembered for signing an incorrect scorecard that kept him out of a playoff for the 1968 Masters Tournament.

== Early life ==
De Vicenzo was born on 14 April 1923 in Villa Ballester, a northern suburb of Buenos Aires, Argentina. He was raised in the Villa Pueyrredón neighborhood of Buenos Aires, and acquired the game of golf as a caddie. He developed his skills at the Ranelagh Golf Club, and later relocated to the town of the same name.

== Professional career ==
De Vicenzo won his first Argentine tournament, the Abierto del Litoral, in 1942; his first World Cup in 1953; and a major tournament, The Open Championship, in 1967.

De Vicenzo is also remembered for his misfortune in the 1968 Masters Tournament. On the par-4 17th hole, Roberto De Vicenzo made a birdie, but playing partner Tommy Aaron inadvertently entered a 4 instead of 3 on the scorecard. He did not check the scorecard for the error before signing it, and according to the Rules of Golf the higher score had to stand and be counted. If not for this mistake, De Vicenzo would have tied for first place with Bob Goalby, and the two would have met in an 18-hole playoff the next day. His quote afterwards became legendary for its poignancy: "What a stupid I am!"

De Vicenzo subsequently found great success in the early days of the Senior PGA Tour, winning the Liberty Mutual Legends of Golf two times and the inaugural U.S. Senior Open in 1980. He also won the 1974 PGA Seniors' Championship, but prior to it became recognized as a senior major championship.

He represented Argentina 15 times and Mexico four times in the Canada Cup/World Cup, leading Argentina to victory in 1953 and twice winning the individual title.

He officially retired on 12 November 2006, at age 83 with over 200 international victories.

== Personal life ==
De Vicenzo died 1 June 2017 at the age of 94.

== Awards and honors ==
- In 1970, he was voted the Bob Jones Award, the highest honor given by the United States Golf Association (USGA) in recognition of distinguished sportsmanship in golf
- In 1989, De Vicenzo was inducted into the World Golf Hall of Fame
- The Museum of Golf in Argentina in Berazategui, Argentina was founded because of his hard work. It was named in his honor upon its completion in 2006.

== Professional wins (229) ==
=== PGA Tour wins (5) ===
Legend
Major championships (1)
Other PGA Tour (6)

No.	Date	Tournament	Winning score	Margin of victory	Runner(s)-up
1	25 May 1957	Colonial National Invitation	+4 (72-74-68-70=284)	1 stroke	(United States) Dick Mayer
2	5 Aug 1957	All American Open	−15 (69-64-70-70=273)	4 strokes	(United States) Gene Littler
3	26 Apr 1966	Dallas Open Invitational	−8 (71-69-69-67=276)	1 stroke	(United States) Joe Campbell, (United States) Raymond Floyd, (South Africa) Harold Henning
4	15 Jul 1967	The Open Championship	−10 (70-71-67-70=278)	2 strokes	(United States) Jack Nicklaus
5	5 May 1968	Houston Champions International	−10 (67-68-71-68=274)	1 stroke	(United States) Lee Trevino

=== European circuit wins (9) ===
- 1948 (1) North British-Harrogate Tournament
- 1950 (3) Dutch Open, Belgian Open, Open de France
- 1960 (1) Open de France
- 1964 (2) Open de France, German Open
- 1966 (1) Spanish Open
- 1967 (1) The Open Championship

=== Argentine Tour wins (132) ===
this list is incomplete

- 1942 (1) Abierto del Litoral
- 1943 (2) Center Open, Westinhouse Grand Prix
- 1944 (3) Argentine PGA Championship, Argentine Open, Cirio Grand Prix
- 1945 (3) Argentine PGA Championship, Cirio Grand Prix, Bahía Blanca Open
- 1946 (5) Palermo Grand Prix, Abierto del Litoral, South Open, La Plata Open, Masllorens Grand Prix
- 1947 (10) Argentine PGA Championship, Abierto del Litoral, South Open, Cirio Grand Prix, Ranelagh Open, Masllorens Grand Prix, Alvear Grand Prix, San Isidro Open, Mailly Grand Prix, America Cup
- 1948 (5) Argentine PGA Championship, Cirio Grand Prix, Masllorens Grand Prix, Ranelagh Open, La Plata Open
- 1949 (6) Argentine PGA Championship, Argentine Open, Abierto del Litoral, Ituzaingo Grand Prix, Masllorens Grand Prix, San Isidro Open
- 1950 (4) Masllorens Grand Prix, Ituzaingo Grand Prix, San Isidro Open, San Martin Grand Prix
- 1951 (5) Argentine PGA Championship, Argentine Open, Msllorens Grand Prix, Alvear Grand Prix, San Isidro Open
- 1952 (2) Argentine Open, San Isidro Open
- 1953 (1) Argentino Grand Prix
- 1954 (2) Alvear Grand Prix, San Martin Grand Prix
- 1958 (1) Argentine Open
- 1960 (3) Argentine PGA Championship, Charles of the Ritz Grand Prix, Siam Grand Prix
- 1961 (1) Ranelagh Open
- 1962 (6) Argentine Masters, North Open, Center Open, South Open, Branca Grand Prix, Suixtill Grand Prix
- 1963 (2) Branca Grand Prix, Tortugas Grand Prix
- 1964 (4) Argentine Masters, Argentine PGA Championship, Minerva Grand Prix, Jockey Club Rosario Open
- 1965 (6) Argentine PGA Championship, Argentine Open, Center Open, Rio Cuarto Open, Acantilados Grand Prix, Jockey Club Rosario Open
- 1966 (4) Argentine Masters, Argentine PGA Championship, North Open, Ranser Grand Prix
- 1967 (6) Argentine Open, Center Open, South Open, Ranelagh Open, Ranser Grand Prix, Pindapoy Grand Prix
- 1968 (4) Abierto del Litoral, Ranelagh Open, Acantilados Grand Prix, Peugeot Grand Prix
- 1969 (6) Argentine PGA Championship, Norpatagonico Open, Ranelagh Open, Glustora Grand Prix, Lomas Open, Kanmar Grand Prix
- 1970 (4) Argentine Open, Argentine Masters, Ranelagh Open, Old Smuggler Grand Prix
- 1971 (5) Argentine PGA Championship, Acantilados Grand Prix, La Cumbre Open, Pinamar Open, Santa Teresita Open
- 1972 (5) Argentine PGA Championship, Center Open, South Open, Ranelagh Open, Acantilados Grand Prix
- 1973 (4) Center Open, South Open, North Open, Lomas Open
- 1974 (8) Argentine PGA Championship, Argentine Masters, Argentine Open, Center Open, North Open, San Martin Grand Prix, Charles of the Ritz Grand Prix, Los Lagartos Grand Prix
- 1975 (2) Jockey Club Rosario Open, Charles of the Ritz Grand Prix
- 1976 (2) Velox Grand Prix, Metropolitano Open
- 1977 (3) Argentine PGA Championship, South Open, Velox Grand Prix
- 1978 South Open, San Martin Grand Prix, Sidesa Grand Prix
- 1979 (3) Acantilados Grand Prix, Sidesa Grand Prix
- 1983 (1) North Open
- 1985 (1) Argentine PGA Championship

=== Latin America/Caribbean wins (60) ===
this list may be incomplete

- 1946 Chile Open (tie with Enrique Bertolino), Viña del Mar Open (Chile)
- 1947 Cali Open (Colombia)
- 1948 Uruguay Open
- 1949 Uruguay Open
- 1951 Cali Open (Colombia), Bogota Open (Colombia), Barranquilla Open (Colombia), Mexican Open
- 1952 Panama Open, Santo Domingo Open (Chile)
- 1953 Panama Open, Mexican Open, Peru Open
- 1954 Brazil Open, Peru Open, Barranquilla Open (Colombia) Bogota Open (Colombia)
- 1955 Mexican Open, PGA of Mexico, Medellin Open (Colombia)
- 1956 Jamaica Open, Barranquilla Open (Colombia), Bogota Open (Colombia), PGA of Mexico
- 1957 Brazil Open, Jamaica Open
- 1958 Peru Open, Medellin Open (Colombia), PGA of Mexico
- 1959 PGA of Mexico
- 1960 Brazil Open, Barranquilla Open (Colombia), Bogota Open (Colombia)
- 1961 Chile Open, Colombian Open, Barranquilla Open (Colombia)
- 1962 Barranquilla Open (Colombia)
- 1963 Brazil Open
- 1964 Brazil Open, Uruguay Open, Bogota Open (Colombia)
- 1965 Los Lagartos Open
- 1966 Los Lagartos Open
- 1968 Los Lagartos Open
- 1969 PGA of Mexico, Los Lagartos Open
- 1970 Itanhanga Open (Brazil)
- 1971 Panama Open
- 1972 Caracas Open, San Pablo Open (Brazil), Rio Grande Open (Brazil)
- 1973 Panama Open, Caracas Open, Brazil Open
- 1974 Panama Open, Raleigh Cup (Mexico)
- 1978 Santiago Open (Chile)
- 1979 Santo Tome Open, Oro Negro Open (Venezuela)

=== Other wins (5) ===
No.	Date	Tournament	Winning score	Margin of victory	Runner(s)-up
1	10 Jun 1951	Palm Beach Round Robin	+40 points	12 points	(Australia) Jim Ferrier
2	24 Jun 1951	Inverness Invitational Four-Ball (with (United States) Henry Ransom)	+9 points	3 points	(Australia) Jim Ferrier and (United States) Sam Snead
3	3 Jun 1953	Canada Cup (with (Argentina) Antonio Cerdá)	−1 (145-142=287)	10 strokes	Canada − Bill Kerr and Stan Leonard
4	11 Nov 1962	Canada Cup International Trophy	−4 (71-68-69-68=276)	2 strokes	(England) Peter Alliss, (United States) Arnold Palmer
5	15 Nov 1970	World Cup International Trophy (2)	−19 (64-67-68-70=269)	1 stroke	(Australia) David Graham

=== Senior PGA Tour wins (2) ===
Legend
Senior major championships (1)
Other Senior PGA Tour (1)

No.	Date	Tournament	Winning score	Margin of victory	Runner-up
1	29 Jun 1980	U.S. Senior Open	−3 (74-73-68-70=285)	4 strokes	(United States) William C. Campbell (a)
2	15 Jul 1984	Merrill Lynch/Golf Digest Commemorative Pro-Am	−8 (70-70-65=205)	2 strokes	(United States) Gardner Dickinson

Senior PGA Tour playoff record (0–1)

No.	Year	Tournament	Opponent	Result
1	1986	Denver Post Champions of Golf	(South Africa) Gary Player	Lost to par on fourth extra hole

=== Other senior wins (16) ===
this list may be incomplete

- 1974 PGA Seniors' Championship, World Senior Championship
- 1979 Liberty Mutual Legends of Golf (with Julius Boros)
- 1983 Liberty Mutual Legends of Golf (with Rod Funseth), Doug Sanders Classic
- 1986 Conmmemorative Pro-Am (Super Senior)
- 1987 Argentine Senior Open, Pontevedra Classic (Super Senior), Digital Classic (Super Senior)
- 1988 Liberty Mutual Legends of Golf - Legendary Division (with Charlie Sifford), Vintage Championship Invitational (Super Senior), Pages Classic (Super Senior)
- 1989 Liberty Mutual Legends of Golf - Legendary Division (with Charlie Sifford), Vantage Championship (Super Senior)
- 1991 Liberty Mutual Legends of Golf - Legendary Division (with Charlie Sifford)
- 1992 Center Senior Argentine Open

== Major championships ==
=== Wins (1) ===
Year	Championship	54 holes	Winning score	Margin	Runner-up
1967	The Open Championship	2 shot lead	−10 (70-71-67-70=278)	2 strokes	(United States) Jack Nicklaus

=== Results timeline ===
Tournament	1948	1949
Masters Tournament		
U.S. Open		
The Open Championship	T3	3
PGA Championship		

Tournament	1950	1951	1952	1953	1954	1955	1956	1957	1958	1959
Masters Tournament	T12	T20					T17		CUT	
U.S. Open		T29					T27	T8	CUT	
The Open Championship	2			6			3	T35		
PGA Championship			R16		QF					

Tournament	1960	1961	1962	1963	1964	1965	1966	1967	1968	1969
Masters Tournament		T22	T33				T22	T10	2	CUT
U.S. Open									T24	
The Open Championship	T3				3	4	T20	1	T10	T3
PGA Championship										

Tournament	1970	1971	1972	1973	1974	1975	1976	1977	1978	1979
Masters Tournament	CUT	T9	T22	T51		CUT				
U.S. Open										
The Open Championship	T17	T11		T28	T51	T28	T32	T48	CUT	CUT
PGA Championship										

Win
Top 10
Did not play

CUT = missed the half-way cut
R16, QF, SF = Round in which player lost in PGA Championship match play
"T" = tied

=== Summary ===
Tournament	Wins	2nd	3rd	Top-5	Top-10	Top-25	Events	Cuts made
Masters Tournament	0	1	0	1	3	9	15	11
U.S. Open	0	0	0	0	1	2	5	4
The Open Championship	1	1	6	9	11	14	22	20
PGA Championship	0	0	0	1	2	2	2	2
Totals	1	2	6	11	17	27	44	37

- Most consecutive cuts made – 14 (1948 Open Championship – 1957 Open Championship)
- Longest streak of top-10s – 3 (twice)

== Champions Tour major championships ==
=== Wins (1) ===
Year	Championship	Winning score	Margin	Runner-up
1980	U.S. Senior Open	−3 (74-73-68-70=285)	4 strokes	(United States) William C. Campbell (a)

== Team appearances ==
- World Cup (representing Argentina): 1953 (winners), 1954, 1955, 1962 (individual winner), 1963, 1964, 1965, 1966, 1968, 1969, 1970 (individual winner), 1971, 1972, 1973, 1974
- World Cup (representing Mexico): 1956, 1959, 1960, 1961

Awards and achievements
Preceded by (Argentina) Horacio Accavallo	Olimpia de Oro; 1967	Succeeded by (Argentina) Nicolino Locche
Preceded by (Argentina) Alberto Demiddi	Olimpia de Oro; 1970	Succeeded by (Argentina) Alberto Demiddi
