= 2008 Tour de las Américas =

Golf tour season

2008 Tour de las Américas season
- Duration: 27 March 2008 – 14 December 2008
- Number of official events: 15
- Most wins: (Argentina) Rafael Gómez (3)
- Order of Merit: (Argentina) Estanislao Goya

The 2008 Tour de las Américas was the 17th season of the Tour de las Américas (formerly the South American Tour), the main professional golf tour in Latin America since it was formed in 1991.

== Schedule ==
The following table lists official events during the 2008 season.

Date	Tournament	Host country	Purse (US$)	Winner (Note: The number in brackets after each winner's name is the number of Tour de las Américas events they had won up to and including that tournament.)	OWGR points	Other tours (Note: CAN − Canadian Tour; CHA − Challenge Tour; TPG − TPG Tour.)
30 Mar	Abierto del Centro	Argentina	200,000	(Argentina) Estanislao Goya (1)	12	CHA, TPG
6 Apr	Abierto Visa de la República	Argentina	200,000	(Finland) Antti Ahokas (n/a)	12	CHA, TPG
13 Apr	Club Colombia Masters	Colombia	180,000	(Netherlands) Wil Besseling (n/a)	12	CHA
20 Apr	Abierto de Chile	Chile	70,000	(Chile) Felipe Aguilar (1)	n/a	
17 May	Copa 3 Diamantes Mitsubishi	Venezuela	Bs.F170,000	(Argentina) Sebastián Saavedra (1)	n/a	
25 May	Televisa Players Championship	Mexico	70,000	(Argentina) Rafael Gómez (6)	n/a	
14 Sep	Canal i Abierto de Venezuela	Venezuela	70,000	(Colombia) Ángel Romero (3)	n/a	
11 Oct	Taurus Abierto de Peru	Peru	70,000	(Argentina) Alan Wagner (1)	n/a	
26 Oct	Carlos Franco Invitational	Paraguay	40,000	(Argentina) Clodomiro Carranza (1)	n/a	TPG
9 Nov	Abierto de San Luis	Argentina	Arg$200,000	(Argentina) Rafael Gómez (7)	n/a	TPG
16 Nov	Abierto del Litoral	Argentina	Arg$150,000	(Argentina) Andrés Romero (5)	n/a	TPG
23 Nov	Roberto De Vicenzo Classic	Argentina	Arg$135,000	(Argentina) Paulo Pinto (2)	n/a	TPG
30 Nov	Sports Frances Open	Chile	160,000	(Argentina) Rafael Gómez (8)	6	CAN
7 Dec	Torneo de Maestros	Argentina	140,000	(Argentina) Fabián Gómez (2)	14	CAN, TPG
14 Dec	Costa Rica Classic	Costa Rica	125,000	(Argentina) Mauricio Molina (1)	6	CAN

== Order of Merit ==
The Order of Merit was based on prize money won during the season, calculated in U.S. dollars.

Position	Player	Prize money ($)
1	(Argentina) Estanislao Goya	58,105
2	(Argentina) Rafael Gómez	57,583
3	(Argentina) Mauricio Molina	34,963
4	(Argentina) Clodomiro Carranza	34,499
5	(Argentina) Sebastián Saavedra	28,372
