= 2006 Tour de las Américas =

Golf tour season

2006 Tour de las Américas season
- Duration: 2 February 2006 – 10 December 2006
- Number of official events: 12
- Order of Merit: (Paraguay) Fabrizio Zanotti

The 2006 Tour de las Américas was the 15th season of the Tour de las Américas (formerly the South American Tour), the main professional golf tour in Latin America since it was formed in 1991.

== Schedule ==
The following table lists official events during the 2006 season.

Date	Tournament	Host country	Purse (US$)	Winner (Note: The number in brackets after each winner's name is the number of Tour de las Américas events they had won up to and including that tournament.)	OWGR points	Other tours (Note: ARG − PGA of Argentina Tour; CHA − Challenge Tour.)
5 Feb	Abierto Movistar Guatemala Open	Guatemala	150,000	(Argentina) Miguel Ángel Carballo (1)	12	CHA
5 Feb	Abierto del Sur Personal	Argentina	55,000	(Argentina) Luciano Giometti (1)	n/a	ARG
12 Feb	Kai Fieberg Costa Rica Open	Costa Rica	125,000	(Sweden) Johan Axgren (n/a)	12	CHA
15 Apr	Abierto Visa del Centro	Argentina	60,000	(Argentina) Ángel Cabrera (6)	n/a	ARG
28 May	TLA Players Championship	Mexico	60,000	(Argentina) Julio Zapata (1)	n/a	
4 Jun	Siemens Venezuela Open	Venezuela	65,000	(Argentina) Fabián Gómez (1)	n/a	
9 Jul	Colombian Open	Colombia	90,000	(Colombia) Manuel Merizalde (1)	n/a	
5 Nov	Torneo de Maestros	Argentina	100,000	(Argentina) Andrés Romero (4)	n/a	ARG
19 Nov	Brazil Classic	Brazil	80,000	(Argentina) Paulo Pinto (1)	n/a	
26 Nov	Abierto de San Luis	Argentina	150,000	(Argentina) Rafael Gómez (5)	n/a	ARG
3 Dec	Abierto Visa de la República	Argentina	200,000	(Argentina) Rafael Echenique (1)	12	ARG, CHA
10 Dec	Abierto Mexicano Corona	Mexico	310,000	(Paraguay) Fabrizio Zanotti (1)	12	CHA

=== Unofficial events ===
The following events were sanctioned by the Tour de las Américas, but did not carry official money, nor were wins official.

Date	Tournament	Host country	Purse ($)	Winner
7 May	Copa 3 Diamantes Mitsubishi	Venezuela	40,000	(Venezuela) Otto Solís

== Order of Merit ==
The Order of Merit was based on prize money won during the season, calculated in U.S. dollars.

Position	Player	Prize money ($)
1	(Paraguay) Fabrizio Zanotti	68,790
