= 2005 PGA of Argentina Tour =

Golf season

The 2005 PGA Argentina Tour was a season of golf tournaments on the PGA of Argentina Tour, the official professional golf tour of Argentina. The season ran from the end of January to the beginning of December, and consisted of sixteen tournaments.

The Order of Merit was won by Ángel Cabrera, ahead of Julio Zapata in second, and Andrés Romero in third.

Three events were co-sanctioned by the Tour de las Americas, the highest level tour in Latin America, with the Argentine Open also being co-sanctioned by the Challenge Tour.

== Schedule of tournaments ==
Date	Tournament	Winner	Purse ($)	Notes	Ref
10 Jan	Pinamar Open	Rafael Gómez			
27 Jan	Acantilados Grand Prix	Clodomiro Carranza			
10 Feb	Carilo Open	Jorge Berendt			
17 Mar	South Open	Rodolfo González			
2 Apr	Abierto del Litoral	Ricardo González			
7 Apr	Norpatagonico Open	Julio Zapata			
20 Apr	Center Open	Ángel Cabrera			
8 Jun	North Open	Ángel Cabrera			
8 Sep	Misiones Open	Daniel Barbetti			
22 Sep	Parana Open	Miguel Fernandez			
16 Oct	Salta Open	Miguel Rodriguez			
6 Nov	Argentine Masters	Ángel Cabrera		Co-sanctioned by the TLA	
13 Nov	Roberto de Vicenzo Classic	Andrés Romero		Co-sanctioned by the TLA	
27 Nov	Lomas Open	Gustavo Acosta			
5 Dec	Argentine Open	Kevin Stadler		Co-sanctioned by the TLA and Challenge Tour	
18 Dec	Argentine PGA Championship	Sebastián Fernández			
