= 2007 TPG Tour =

Golf tour season

2007 TPG Tour season
- Duration: 22 February 2007 – 9 December 2007
- Number of official events: 17
- Most wins: (Argentina) Ángel Cabrera (2) (Argentina) Rafael Gómez (2) (Argentina) Miguel Rodríguez (2) (Argentina) Andrés Romero (2) (Paraguay) Marco Ruiz (2)
- Order of Merit: (Argentina) Rafael Gómez

The 2007 TPG Tour was the inaugural season of the TPG Tour, the main professional golf tour in Argentina since it was formed in 2007.

== Schedule ==
The following table lists official events during the 2007 season.

Date	Tournament	Location	Purse (Arg$)	Winner (Note: The number in brackets after each winner's name is the number of TPG Tour events they had won up to and including that tournament.)	OWGR points	Other tours (Note: CHA − Challenge Tour; TLA − Tour de las Américas.)
25 Feb	Abierto de Pinamar	Buenos Aires	70,000	(Argentina) Miguel Rodríguez (1)	n/a	
3 Mar	Abierto del Sur	Buenos Aires	100,000	(Argentina) Rafael Gómez (1)	n/a	
10 Mar	Abierto de la Mesopotamia	Entre Ríos	70,000	(Argentina) Julio Zapata (1)	n/a	
15 Apr	Abierto Visa del Centro	Córdoba	200,000	(Argentina) Ángel Cabrera (1)	n/a	TLA
22 Apr	Ángel Cabrera Classic	Córdoba	120,000	(Argentina) Rafael Gómez (2)	n/a	
29 Apr	Abierto del Nordeste	Chaco	70,000	(Argentina) Fabián Gómez (1)	n/a	
9 Jun	Abierto del Norte	Tucumán	80,000	(Argentina) Ricardo González (1) (Argentina) Andrés Romero (1)	n/a	
9 Aug	Abierto de Misiones	Misiones	70,000	(Argentina) Sergio Acevedo (1)	n/a	
19 Aug	Carlos Franco Invitational	Paraguay	US$30,000	(Paraguay) Marco Ruiz (1)	n/a	
29 Sep	Abierto de Salta	Salta	80,000	(Argentina) Andrés Romero (2)	n/a	
7 Oct	Personal Classic	Buenos Aires	70,000	(Argentina) Diego Ortiz (1)	n/a	
27 Oct	Torneo de Maestros	Buenos Aires	420,000	(Argentina) Ángel Cabrera (2)	n/a	TLA
4 Nov	Abierto de Mendoza	Mendoza	80,000	(Argentina) Rafael Echenique (1)	n/a	
11 Nov	Roberto De Vicenzo Classic	Buenos Aires	120,000	(Argentina) Miguel Guzmán (1)	n/a	
25 Nov	Abierto de San Luis	San Luis	450,000	(Argentina) Emilio Domínguez (1)	n/a	TLA
2 Dec	Abierto del Litoral Personal	Santa Fe	US$170,000	(Argentina) Miguel Rodríguez (2)	12	CHA, TLA
9 Dec	Abierto Visa de la República	Buenos Aires	US$200,000	(Paraguay) Marco Ruiz (2)	12	CHA, TLA

== Order of Merit ==
The Order of Merit was based on tournament results during the season, calculated using a points-based system.

Position	Player	Points
1	(Argentina) Rafael Gómez	133,780
2	(Paraguay) Marco Ruiz	131,846
3	(Argentina) Ángel Cabrera	131,368
4	(Argentina) Daniel Vancsik	108,468
5	(Argentina) Miguel Rodríguez	103,662
