= 2005 Tour de las Américas =

Golf tour season

2005 Tour de las Américas season
- Duration: 10 February 2005 – 11 December 2005
- Number of official events: 13
- Order of Merit: (Argentina) Daniel Barbetti

The 2005 Tour de las Américas, titled as the 2005 American Express Tour de las Américas for sponsorship reasons, was the 14th season of the Tour de las Américas (formerly the South American Tour), the main professional golf tour in Latin America since it was formed in 1991.

== Schedule ==
The following table lists official events during the 2005 season.

Date	Tournament	Host country	Purse (US$)	Winner (Note: The number in brackets after each winner's name is the number of Tour de las Américas events they had won up to and including that tournament.)	OWGR points	Other tours (Note: ARG − PGA of Argentina Tour; CHA − Challenge Tour.)
13 Feb	American Express Costa Rica Open	Costa Rica	125,000	(United States) Kyle Dobbs (1)	6	CHA
20 Feb	Summit Panama Masters	Panama	125,000	(United States) Kevin Haefner (1)	6	CHA
27 Feb	Abierto Telefónica Moviles de Guatemala	Guatemala	125,000	(Argentina) César Monasterio (1)	6	CHA
8 Mar	Siemens Venezuela Open	Venezuela	60,000	(Argentina) Miguel Rodríguez (1)	n/a	
15 Mar	American Express Puerto Rico Open	Puerto Rico	125,000	(Argentina) Daniel Barbetti (1)	n/a	
22 May	Players Championship Acafest	Mexico	50,000	(Mexico) Antonio Serna (1)	n/a	
5 Jun	American Express Brazil Classic	Brazil	70,000	(Argentina) Miguel Fernández (2)	n/a	
28 Oct	MasterCard Brazil Open	Brazil	100,000	(Argentina) Miguel Guzmán (1)	n/a	
6 Nov	Torneo de Maestros	Argentina	70,000	(Argentina) Ángel Cabrera (5)	n/a	ARG
13 Nov	Roberto De Vicenzo Classic	Argentina	70,000	(Argentina) Andrés Romero (3)	n/a	ARG
4 Dec	Abierto Mexicano Corona	Mexico	305,000	(Mexico) Antonio Maldonado (1)	6	CHA
4 Dec	Abierto de Barranquilla	Colombia	65,000	(Colombia) Oswaldo Villada (1)	n/a	
11 Dec	Abierto Visa de la República	Argentina	250,000	(United States) Kevin Stadler (n/a)	12	ARG, CHA

=== Unofficial events ===
The following events were sanctioned by the Tour de las Américas, but did not carry official money, nor were wins official.

Date	Tournament	Host country	Purse ($)	Winner
9 Oct	Paradise Village Nations Cup	Mexico	n/a	(Venezuela) Manuel Bermudez and (Venezuela) Carlos Larraín

== Order of Merit ==
The Order of Merit was based on prize money won during the season, calculated in U.S. dollars.

Position	Player	Prize money ($)
1	(Argentina) Daniel Barbetti	41,514
2	(Argentina) Rafael Gómez	40,594
3	(Argentina) César Monasterio	35,133
4	(Argentina) Miguel Rodríguez	35,066
5	(Argentina) Eduardo Argiró	31,423
