= Peru Open =

Diners Club Peru Open
Tournament information
- Location: Lima, Peru
- Established: 1953
- Course: Los Inkas Golf Club
- Par: 72
- Length: 6,914 yards (6,322 m)
- Tours: Challenge Tour; PGA Tour Americas; PGA Tour Latinoamérica; Tour de las Américas
- Format: Stroke play
- Prize fund: US$225,000
- Month played: April

Tournament record score
- Aggregate: 266 Sebastián Fernández (2010); 266 José Toledo (2022)
- To par: −22 as above

Current champion
- (United States) Cole Anderson

Final champion
- Location in Peru

The Peru Open, or Abierto de Perú, is the national open golf tournament of Peru. It was first played in 1982, although previous tournaments had previously been held using the same name. It was an event on the South American Tour from 1995 to 2000, and revived as a stop on the Tour de las Américas in 2004, when it was co-sanctioned by the European Challenge Tour, and 2008. It is currently an event on PGA Tour Latinoamérica.

== Winners ==
Year	Tour(s) (Note: CHA − Challenge Tour; PGATAM − PGA Tour Americas; PGATLA − PGA Tour Latinoamérica; TLA − Tour de las Américas.)	Winner	Score	To par	Margin of victory	Runner(s)-up
Diners Club Peru Open
2026	PGATAM	(United States) Cole Anderson	267	−21	Playoff	(United States) Patrick Flavin
2025	PGATAM	(United States) Hunter Wolcott	269	−19	2 strokes	(United States) David Perkins
2024	PGATAM	(Canada) Stuart Macdonald	271	−17	2 strokes	(United States) Samuel Anderson
2023	PGATLA	(Argentina) Marcos Montenegro	273	−15	2 strokes	(United States) Conner Godsey
2022	PGATLA	(Guatemala) José Toledo	266	−22	6 strokes	(Mexico) Raúl Pereda
2021: No tournament
2020	PGATLA	No tournament due to the COVID-19 pandemic				
2019	PGATLA	(Argentina) Leandro Marelli	269	−19	1 stroke	(United States) John Somers
2018	PGATLA	(United States) Harry Higgs	269	−19	2 strokes	(Spain) Mario Beltrán (United States) David Denlinger
Lexus Peru Open
2017	PGATLA	(United States) Charlie Saxon	200 (Note: Shortened to 54 holes due to a local curfew.)	−16	4 strokes	(United States) Jimmy Beck (United States) Nick Palladino
2016	PGATLA	(United States) Tyler McCumber	270	−18	3 strokes	(United States) Martin Trainer
2015	PGATLA	(Mexico) Rodolfo Cazaubón	268	−20	Playoff	(United States) Kent Bulle
2014	PGATLA	(Argentina) Julián Etulain (2)	274	−14	3 strokes	(United States) Robert Rohanna (Argentina) Sebastián Saavedra
2013	PGATLA	(Argentina) Julián Etulain	275	−13	1 stroke	(United States) Ryan Blaum (United States) Bronson Burgoon
2012	PGATLA	(Peru) Sebastián Salem	275	−13	1 stroke	(Argentina) Clodomiro Carranza (Colombia) Andrés Echavarría (Paraguay) Carlos Franco (Argentina) Maximiliano Godoy
Toyota Peru Open
2011	TLA	(Chile) Benjamín Alvarado	273	−15	2 strokes	(Argentina) Julián Etulain
2010	TLA	(Argentina) Sebastián Fernández	266	−22	7 strokes	(Chile) Cristian Espinoza
2009: No tournament
Taurus Abierto de Peru
2008	TLA	(Argentina) Alan Wagner	275	−13	2 strokes	(Colombia) Juan Echeverri
2005–2007: No tournament
TIM Peru Open
2004	CHA, TLA	(United States) Brad Sutterfield	276	−12	1 stroke	(England) Stuart Davis (Northern Ireland) Michael Hoey
2001–2003: No tournament
Peru Open
2000	TLA	(United States) Scott Dunlap (3)	278	−10	Playoff	(United States) Shannon Sykora
1999	TLA	(United States) Scott Dunlap (2)	273	−15	1 stroke	(Argentina) Gustavo Rojas
1998		(United States) Scott Dunlap	275	−13	2 strokes	(Paraguay) Ángel Franco
1997		(Canada) Philip Jonas (2)	269	−19	6 strokes	(Paraguay) Esteban Isasi
1996		(Canada) Philip Jonas	276	−12	1 stroke	(Paraguay) Pedro Martínez
1995		(Paraguay) Raúl Fretes (2)	269	−19	4 strokes	(Argentina) Ángel Cabrera (Paraguay) Ángel Franco
1994		(United States) David Ogrin (2)	272	−16	5 strokes	(Paraguay) Raúl Fretes (Argentina) Gustavo Rojas
1993		(Paraguay) Pedro Martínez	274	−14	2 strokes	(Paraguay) Ángel Franco
1992		(Paraguay) Raúl Fretes	279	−9	1 stroke	(Paraguay) Ángel Franco
1991		(United States) Perry Moss				
1990		(Chile) Roy Mackenzie				
1989		(Brazil) Eduardo Caballero				
1988		(United States) David Ogrin	282	−6	1 stroke	(Chile) Guillermo Encina
1987		(United States) Bob Lohr	285	−3	Playoff	(United States) Jim Albus (Paraguay) Carlos Franco
1986		(Brazil) Priscillo Diniz (2)	282	−6	2 strokes	(Colombia) Juan Pinzon
1985		(Brazil) Priscillo Diniz	284	−4	Playoff	(Venezuela) Ramón Muñoz
1984		(Brazil) Federico German				
1983		(Peru) Niceforo Quispe				
1982		(Peru) Gonzalo Urbina				
1975–1981: No tournament
1974		(Argentina) Fidel de Luca (2)				
1970–1973: No tournament
1969		(Peru) Rodolfo Coscia				
1968		(Argentina) Raul Travieso				
1967		(Argentina) Florentino Molina				
1966: No tournament
1965		(Peru) Hugo Nari (2)				
1964		(Peru) Hugo Nari				
1959–1963: No tournament
1958		(Argentina) Roberto De Vicenzo (3)				
1956–57: No tournament
1955		(Argentina) Fidel de Luca				
1954		(Argentina) Roberto De Vicenzo (2)				
1953		(Argentina) Roberto De Vicenzo				

== See also ==
- Open golf tournament
