= 2012 TPG Tour =

Golf tour season

2012 TPG Tour season
- Duration: 23 February 2012 – 22 December 2012
- Number of official events: 15
- Most wins: (Argentina) Clodomiro Carranza (2)
- Order of Merit: (Argentina) Clodomiro Carranza

The 2012 TPG Tour was the sixth season of the TPG Tour, the main professional golf tour in Argentina since it was formed in 2007.

== Schedule ==
The following table lists official events during the 2012 season.

Date	Tournament	Location	Purse (Arg$)	Winner (Note: The number in brackets after each winner's name is the number of TPG Tour events they had won up to and including that tournament.)	OWGR points	Other tours (Note: TLA − Tour de las Américas.)
26 Feb	Abierto del Sur	Buenos Aires	200,000	(Argentina) Mauricio Molina (3)	n/a	
11 Mar	Abierto Norpatagónico	Buenos Aires	200,000	(Argentina) Ariel Cañete (1)	n/a	
15 Apr	Abierto del Centro	Córdoba	350,000	(Argentina) César Costilla (2)	6	TLA
29 Apr	Abierto de La Rioja	La Rioja	200,000	(Argentina) Clodomiro Carranza (2)	n/a	
19 May	Abierto del Nordeste	Chaco	280,000	(Argentina) Luciana Dodda (1)	6	TLA
15 Jul	Abierto de Misiones	Misiones	200,000	(Argentina) Francisco Ojeda (1)	n/a	
29 Jul	Abierto Termas de Río Hondo	Santiago del Estero	200,000	(Argentina) Clodomiro Carranza (3)	n/a	
30 Sep	Argentine PGA Championship	Buenos Aires	400,000	(Argentina) Ricardo González (4)	n/a	
20 Oct	Gran Premio Las Praderas	Buenos Aires	250,000	(Argentina) César Monasterio (2)	n/a	
26 Oct	Tupungato Winelands Match Play	Buenos Aires	250,000	(Argentina) Miguel Rodríguez (4)	n/a	
18 Nov	Gran Premio Los Pingüinos	Buenos Aires	150,000	(Argentina) Ary Rodríguez (1)	n/a	
25 Nov	Abierto de San Luis	San Luis	200,000	(Argentina) Julio Zapata (4)	n/a	
2 Dec	Abierto del Litoral	Santa Fe	200,000	(Argentina) Santiago Bauni (a) (1)	n/a	
15 Dec	Carlos Franco Invitational	Paraguay	200,000	(Paraguay) Ángel Franco (1)	n/a	
22 Dec	Ángel Cabrera Classic	Córdoba	250,000	(Argentina) Ángel Cabrera (3)	n/a	

== Order of Merit ==
The Order of Merit was based on tournament results during the season, calculated using a points-based system.

Position	Player	Points
1	(Argentina) Clodomiro Carranza	136,427
2	(Argentina) Julio Zapata	134,515
3	(Argentina) César Costilla	130,253
4	(Argentina) Ricardo González	95,582
5	(Argentina) César Monasterio	87,908
