= Rafael Ponce =

Ecuadorian golfer

Personal information
- Full name: Rafael Ponce
- Nationality: Ecuador
- Born: 22 June 1963 (age 63)
- Height: 1.78 m (5 ft 10 in)

Career
- Sport: Golf
- Turned professional: 1990
- Former tours: Asian Tour; Tour de las Américas
- Professional wins: 3

Rafael Ponce (born 22 June 1963) is an Ecuadorian golfer.

== Career ==
He has spent over a decade on the Asian Tour, where he has several top ten finishes. His professional wins include the 1995 Hugo Boss Open in China and the 2004 TLA Players Championship in Mexico, which was a Tour de las Américas event.

== Professional wins (3) ==
=== Tour de las Américas wins (1) ===
No.	Date	Tournament	Winning score	Margin of victory	Runner-up
1	29 May 2004	Acapulco Fest	−20 (65-65-62-68=260)	9 strokes	(Argentina) Rodolfo González

=== Volvo China Tour wins (1) ===
- 1995 Hugo Boss Open (China)

=== Other wins (1) ===
- 2007 Abierto Internacional de Golf del Eje Cafetero
