= Venezuela Open =

Tournament information
- Location: Caracas, Venezuela
- Established: 1957
- Course: Valle Arriba Golf Club
- Par: 70
- Tours: PGA Tour; Tour de las Américas; PGA Tour Latinoamérica Developmental Series; Caribbean Tour
- Format: Stroke play
- Prize fund: US$50,000
- Month played: April

Tournament record score
- Aggregate: 263 Roberto De Vicenzo (1973)
- To par: −18 Iván Camilo Ramírez (2021)

Current champion
- (Colombia) Esteban Jaramillo

Location map
- Location in Venezuela

The Venezuela Open or Abierto de Venezuela is a men's professional golf tournament. It has only been staged intermittently since 1957, 2019 being the 35th edition of the event. Al Geiberger, Art Wall Jr., David Graham, Roberto De Vicenzo and Tony Jacklin are past champions.

== History ==
Since 2014, the Venezuela Open has been a fixture on the PGA Tour Latinoamérica Developmental Series. From 1979 to 2009 it made frequent appearances on the South American Tour, later known as the Tour de las Américas. Between 1961 and 1973 the tournament was a regular stop on the PGA-sponsored Caribbean Tour, when it was called the Caracas Open or Caracas Open Invitational. The second event in 1957 was co-sponsored by the PGA.

The event has generally been played at three venues in Caracas: Caracas Country Club, Valle Arriba Golf Club and Lagunita Country Club. In 1999 it was held at Izcaragua Country Club, a short distance east of Caracas while in 2000 it was played at Barquisimeto Golf Club near Barquisimeto.

== Winners ==
Year	Tour (Note: CAB − Caribbean Tour; PGAT − PGA Tour; PGATLADEV − PGA Tour Latinoamérica Developmental Series; TLA − Tour de las Américas.)	Winner	Score	To par	Margin of victory	Runner(s)-up	Venue	Ref.
Abierto de Venezuela
2026		(Colombia) Esteban Jaramillo	266	−14	3 strokes	(Colombia) Carlos Ernesto Rodríguez	Valle Arriba	
2025		(Venezuela) Jorge Pichu García	270	−10	Playoff	(Mexico) Cristian Romero	Valle Arriba	
2024		(Venezuela) Wolmer Murillo	274	−6	Playoff	(Argentina) Julián Etulain	Guataparo	
2023	PGATLADEV	(Argentina) Julián Etulain	272	−8	9 strokes	(Chile) Toto Gana (Venezuela) Santiago Quintero	Guataparo	
Venezuela Open
2022	PGATLADEV	(Venezuela) Virgilio Paz (a)	267	−13	7 strokes	(Venezuela) Alfredo Adrián	Guataparo	
2021	PGATLADEV	(Colombia) Iván Camilo Ramírez	266	−18	4 strokes	(Venezuela) Manuel Torres	Caracas	
2020: No tournament
2019	PGATLADEV	(Venezuela) George Trujillo (2)	270	−14	1 stroke	(Venezuela) Manuel Torres	Caracas	
2018	PGATLADEV	(Venezuela) George Trujillo	279	−5	2 strokes	(Venezuela) Miguel Martinez	Caracas	
2017: No tournament
2016	PGATLADEV	(Venezuela) Denis Meneghini	278	−2	1 stroke	(Venezuela) Otto Solís	Valle Arriba	
2015	PGATLADEV	(Venezuela) Rafael Guerrero	277	−3	2 strokes	(Venezuela) Alejandro Perazzo (a)	Lagunita	
2014	PGATLADEV	(Venezuela) Diego Larrazábal	207	−3	Playoff (Note: Larrazábal won on the third hole of a sudden-death playoff. Morantes was eliminated at the first hole.)	(Venezuela) Denis Meneghini (Venezuela) Gustavo Morantes (a)	Lagunita	
2010–2013: No tournament
2009	TLA	(Argentina) Daniel Barbetti	270	−10	2 strokes	(Colombia) Jesús Amaya (Paraguay) Raúl Fretes	Lagunita	
Canal i Abierto de Venezuela
2008	TLA	(Colombia) Ángel Romero (2)	273	−7	1 stroke	(Colombia) Diego Vanegas	Lagunita	
2007	TLA	(Colombia) Jesús Amaya (2)	268	−12	3 strokes	(Argentina) Fabián Gómez (Argentina) Sebastián Saavedra	Valle Arriba	
Siemens Venezuela Open
2006	TLA	(Argentina) Fabián Gómez	265	−15	2 strokes	(Argentina) Miguel Guzmán	Valle Arriba	
2005	TLA	(Argentina) Miguel Rodríguez	269	−11	2 strokes	(Colombia) Jesús Amaya	Lagunita	
CANTV Venezuela Open
2004	TLA	(Venezuela) Miguel Martinez	265	−15	1 stroke	(Puerto Rico) Wilfredo Morales	Valle Arriba	
2003: No tournament
2002	TLA	(Colombia) Jesús Amaya	266	−14	4 strokes	(Paraguay) Raúl Fretes	Lagunita	
Movilnet Venezuela Open
2001	TLA	(Mexico) Rafael Alarcón	268	−12	1 stroke	(Brazil) Alexandre Rocha	Lagunita	
Venezuela Open
2000		(Colombia) Rigoberto Velásquez	283	−1	1 stroke	(Colombia) Ángel Romero	Barquisimeto	
1999		(Colombia) Ángel Romero	279	−1			Izcaragua	
1998		(Colombia) Gustavo Mendoza	268	−12			Lagunita	
1986–1997: No tournament
1985		(Venezuela) Ramón Muñoz	269	−11			Valle Arriba	
1983–1984: No tournament
1982		(Northern Ireland) Ronan Rafferty	272	−8	1 stroke	(United States) Lee Carter	Lagunita	
1981		(United States) Jack Ferencz	267	−13	Playoff (Note: Ferenz won with a par on the first hole of a sudden-death playoff.)	(Australia) David Graham	Valle Arriba	
1980: No tournament
1979		(England) Tony Jacklin	276	−4	2 strokes	(Spain) Manuel Piñero	Lagunita	
1974–1978: No tournament
Caracas Open
1973	CAB	(Argentina) Roberto De Vicenzo (2)	272	−8	1 stroke	(Argentina) Vicente Fernández (England) Peter Oosterhuis	Valle Arriba	
1972	CAB	(Argentina) Roberto De Vicenzo	263	−17	10 strokes	(United States) John Cook	Valle Arriba	
1971	CAB	(Australia) David Graham	272	−8	1 stroke	(United States) Tommy Bolt	Valle Arriba	
1970: No tournament
1969		(England) Peter Townsend	276	−4	Playoff (Note: Townsend won with a birdie on the first hole of a sudden-death playoff.)	(Venezuela) Ramón Muñoz	Valle Arriba	
1968	CAB	(United States) Bert Weaver	269	−11	1 stroke	(United States) Wes Ellis	Valle Arriba	
1967	CAB	(United States) Rick Rhoads	276	−4	Playoff (Note: Rhoads won with a birdie on the first hole of a sudden-death playoff.)	(Canada) Alvie Thompson	Valle Arriba	
1966	CAB	(United States) Art Wall Jr. (2)	276	−4	1 stroke	(United States) Wes Ellis (United States) Dean Refram	Valle Arriba	
1965 (Nov)	CAB	(United States) Al Besselink (3)	275	−5	1 stroke	(United States) Art Wall Jr.	Valle Arriba	
1965 (Feb)	CAB	(United States) Al Besselink (2)	273	−7	3 strokes	(United States) Wes Ellis	Valle Arriba	
1964	CAB	(Canada) George Knudson	277	−3	3 strokes	(Spain) Ramón Sota	Valle Arriba	
1963	CAB	(United States) Art Wall Jr.	274	−6	2 strokes	(Canada) George Knudson	Valle Arriba	
1962	CAB	(United States) Al Geiberger	278	−2	1 stroke	(United States) Jacky Cupit	Valle Arriba	
1961	CAB	(United States) Don Whitt	272	−8	8 strokes	(United States) Joe Moore	Valle Arriba	
Venezuela Open
1958–1960: No tournament
1957 (Dec)		(United States) Al Besselink	279	−1	Playoff (Note: Besselink won with a birdie on the first hole of a sudden-death playoff.)	(United States) Bob Rosburg	Valle Arriba	
1957 (Feb)		(Belgium) Flory Van Donck	277	−7	1 stroke	(United States) Joe Conrad (Argentina) Roberto De Vicenzo	Caracas	

== See also ==
- Open golf tournament
