= 2004 Tour de las Américas =

Golf tour season

2004 Tour de las Américas season
- Duration: 7 January 2004 – 12 December 2004
- Number of official events: 12
- Order of Merit: (Argentina) Rafael Gómez

The 2004 Tour de las Américas, titled as the 2004 American Express Tour de las Américas for sponsorship reasons, was the 13th season of the Tour de las Américas (formerly the South American Tour), the main professional golf tour in Latin America since it was formed in 1991.

== Schedule ==
The following table lists official events during the 2004 season.

Date	Tournament	Host country	Purse (US$)	Winner (Note: The number in brackets after each winner's name is the number of Tour de las Américas events they had won up to and including that tournament.)	OWGR points	Other tours (Note: ARG − Argentine Professional Golf Tour; CHA − Challenge Tour.)
10 Jan	Caribbean Open	Bahamas	40,000	(United States) Tim Conley (1)	n/a	
1 Feb	Abierto del Sur	Argentina	50,000	(Argentina) Ángel Cabrera (4)	n/a	ARG
15 Feb	Summit Panama Masters	Panama	100,000	(Argentina) Miguel Fernández (1)	6	CHA
22 Feb	Costa Rica Open	Costa Rica	110,000	(Italy) Alessandro Tadini (n/a)	6	CHA
29 Feb	Abierto Telefónica	Guatemala	110,000	(Argentina) Daniel Vancsik (2)	6	CHA
21 Mar	American Express Puerto Rico Open	Puerto Rico	110,000	(Argentina) Rodolfo González (1)	n/a	
27 Mar	American Express Dominican Republic Open	Dominican Republic	70,000	(Puerto Rico) Wilfredo Morales (1)	n/a	
29 May	Acapulco Fest	Mexico	50,000	(Ecuador) Rafael Ponce (1)	n/a	
6 Jun	CANTV Venezuela Open	Venezuela	50,000	(Venezuela) Miguel Martinez (1)	n/a	
28 Nov	Abierto Mexicano de Golf	Mexico	300,000	(Argentina) Rafael Gómez (4)	6	CHA
5 Dec	Panasonic Panama Open	Panama	200,000	(England) Richard McEvoy (n/a)	6	CHA
12 Dec	TIM Peru Open	Peru	168,000	(United States) Brad Sutterfield (n/a)	6	CHA

=== Unofficial events ===
The following events were sanctioned by the Tour de las Américas, but did not carry official money, nor were wins official.

Date	Tournament	Host country	Purse ($)	Winner
3 Oct	Paradise Village Nations Cup	Mexico	n/a	(Mexico) Pablo del Olmo and (Mexico) Alex Quiroz

== Order of Merit ==
The Order of Merit was based on prize money won during the season, calculated in U.S. dollars.

Position	Player	Prize money ($)
1	(Argentina) Rafael Gómez	59,220
2	(Argentina) Rodolfo González	41,030
3	(Argentina) Miguel Fernández	28,462
4	(Argentina) Eduardo Argiró	28,301
5	(Argentina) Mauricio Molina	23,996
