= 2001–02 Tour de las Américas =

Golf tour season

2001–02 Tour de las Américas season
- Duration: 15 November 2001 – 1 December 2002
- Number of official events: 15
- Most wins: (Colombia) Jesús Amaya (3)
- Order of Merit: (Argentina) Rafael Gómez

The 2001–02 Tour de las Américas was the 11th season of the Tour de las Américas (formerly the South American Tour), the main professional golf tour in Latin America since it was formed in 1991.

== Schedule ==
The following table lists official events during the 2001–02 season.

Date	Tournament	Host country	Purse (US$)	Winner (Note: The number in brackets after each winner's name is the number of Tour de las Américas events they had won up to and including that tournament.)
18 Nov	Movilnet Venezuela Open	Venezuela	120,000	(Mexico) Rafael Alarcón (1)
25 Nov	Abierto del Litoral	Argentina	60,000	(Paraguay) Marco Ruiz (1)
2 Dec	Chevrolet Brazil Open	Brazil	110,000	(Paraguay) Carlos Franco (3)
9 Dec	Torneo de Maestros Telefónica	Argentina	100,000	(Argentina) Ángel Cabrera (2)
16 Dec	Bavaria Paraguay Open	Paraguay	50,000	(Paraguay) Raúl Fretes (8)
20 Jan	Corona Caribbean Open	Bahamas	50,000	(Argentina) Rafael Gómez (1)
10 Feb	Los Encinos Open	Mexico	80,000	(United States) Roland Thatcher (1)
17 Feb	American Express Costa Rica Open	Costa Rica	80,000	(Argentina) Rafael Gómez (2)
24 Feb	Tikal Trophy Guatemala Open	Guatemala	80,000	(Argentina) Sebastián Fernández (1)
3 Mar	LG Panama Masters	Panama	75,000	(Paraguay) Pedro Martínez (4)
19 May	TLA Players Championship Acapulco Fest	Mexico	70,000	(Argentina) Roberto Cóceres (2)
10 Nov	Abierto de Medellín	Colombia	50,000	(Colombia) Jesús Amaya (3)
17 Nov	Serrezuela Masters	Colombia	50,000	(Colombia) Jesús Amaya (4)
24 Nov	CANTV Venezuela Open	Venezuela	100,000	(Colombia) Jesús Amaya (5)
1 Dec	Abierto de Argentina	Argentina	40,000	(Argentina) Ángel Cabrera (3)

=== Unofficial events ===
The following events were sanctioned by the Tour de las Américas, but did not carry official money, nor were wins official.

Date	Tournament	Host country	Purse ($)	Winner
12 Oct	Copa de Naciones	Mexico	n/a	(Venezuela) Jaime Acevedo and (Venezuela) Carlos Larraín

== Order of Merit ==
The Order of Merit was based on prize money won during the season, calculated in U.S. dollars.

Position	Player	Prize money ($)
1	(Argentina) Rafael Gómez	55,987
2	(Paraguay) Marco Ruiz	35,750
3	(Argentina) Gustavo Acosta	32,700
4	(Colombia) Jesús Amaya	31,438
5	(Argentina) Miguel Guzmán	30,505
