= 2007 Tour de las Américas =

Golf tour season

2007 Tour de las Américas season
- Duration: 1 February 2007 – 9 December 2007
- Number of official events: 10
- Most wins: (Argentina) Ángel Cabrera (2) (Argentina) Miguel Rodríguez (2)
- Order of Merit: (Argentina) Miguel Rodríguez

The 2007 Tour de las Américas was the 16th season of the Tour de las Américas (formerly the South American Tour), the main professional golf tour in Latin America since it was formed in 1991.

== Schedule ==
The following table lists official events during the 2007 season.

Date	Tournament	Host country	Purse (US$)	Winner (Note: The number in brackets after each winner's name is the number of Tour de las Américas events they had won up to and including that tournament.)	OWGR points	Other tours (Note: CHA − Challenge Tour; TPG − TPG Tour.)
4 Feb	Club Colombia Masters	Colombia	175,000	(Italy) Edoardo Molinari (n/a)	12	CHA
11 Feb	Kai Fieberg Costa Rica Open	Costa Rica	175,000	(Argentina) Miguel Rodríguez (2)	12	CHA
18 Feb	Abierto Telefónica de Guatemala	Guatemala	150,000	(Wales) Jamie Donaldson (n/a)	12	CHA
15 Apr	Abierto Visa del Centro	Argentina	Arg$200,000	(Argentina) Ángel Cabrera (7)	n/a	TPG
6 May	Canal i Abierto de Venezuela	Venezuela	70,000	(Colombia) Jesús Amaya (6)	n/a	
27 Oct	Torneo de Maestros	Argentina	Arg$420,000	(Argentina) Ángel Cabrera (8)	n/a	TPG
4 Nov	Abierto de Chile	Chile	60,000	(Chile) Ángel Fernández (1)	n/a	
25 Nov	Abierto de San Luis	Argentina	Arg$450,000	(Argentina) Emilio Domínguez (1)	n/a	TPG
2 Dec	Abierto del Litoral Personal	Argentina	170,000	(Argentina) Miguel Rodríguez (3)	12	CHA, TPG
9 Dec	Abierto Visa de la República	Argentina	200,000	(Paraguay) Marco Ruiz (2)	12	CHA, TPG

=== Unofficial events ===
The following events were sanctioned by the Tour de las Américas, but did not carry official money, nor were wins official.

Date	Tournament	Host country	Purse ($)	Winner
12 May	Copa 3 Diamantes Mitsubishi	Venezuela	Bs140,000,000	(Argentina) Sebastián Saavedra

== Order of Merit ==
The Order of Merit was based on prize money won during the season, calculated in U.S. dollars.

Position	Player	Prize money ($)
1	(Argentina) Miguel Rodríguez	60,181
2	(Argentina) Emilio Domínguez	43,123
3	(Argentina) Gustavo Acosta	37,182
4	(Argentina) Rafael Gómez	36,116
5	(Paraguay) Marco Ruiz	35,162
