= Panama Open =

Golf tournament

Panasonic Panama Open
Tournament information
- Location: Coloncito, Panama
- Established: 1938
- Courses: Coronado Beach and Golf Resort
- Par: 72
- Tours: Tour de las Américas; Challenge Tour; Canadian Tour
- Format: Stroke play
- Prize fund: US$200,000
- Month played: December
- Final year: 2004

Tournament record score
- Aggregate: 265 Roberto De Vicenzo (1973)
- To par: −23 as above

Final champion
- (England) Richard McEvoy
- Location in Panama

The Panama Open was a golf tournament played from 1938 to 1982, during which time it was won by some of the biggest names in professional golf, including Sam Snead and Arnold Palmer. It was an event on the PGA-sponsored Caribbean Tour between 1958 and 1974. Following the demise of the Caribbean Tour the tournament was not played for several years, until there was a brief revival between 1979 and 1982.

The Panama Open was revived in 1996, when it was an unofficial event on the Canadian Tour; it became an official tournament in 2001 and 2002. In 2003, it was an event on the Tour de las Américas, and the following year, it was co-sanctioned by the European Challenge Tour (2005 season).

== Winners ==
Year	Tour(s) (Note: CAN − Canadian Tour; CHA − Challenge Tour; TLA − Tour de las Américas.)	Winner	Score	To par	Margin of victory	Runner(s)-up	Ref.
Panasonic Panama Open
2004	CHA, TLA	(England) Richard McEvoy	277	−11	1 stroke	(Paraguay) Marco Ruiz	
Samsung Panama Open
2003	TLA	(United States) Charles Warren	284	−4	1 stroke	(United States) Ken Duke	
Panasonic Panama Open
2002	CAN (Note: In 2002, the event was sanctioned by the Canadian Tour, but did not count towards the Order of Merit.)	(United States) Mario Tiziani	273	−15	Playoff	(United States) David Kirkpatrick (United States) Chad Wright	
2001	CAN	(United States) Steve Runge	272	−16	2 strokes	(United States) Jonathan Byrd	
Panama Open
2000		(United States) Steve Haskins					
1999		(Colombia) Gustavo Mendoza			Playoff	(United States) Sonny Skinner	
1998		(United States) Bob Friend	281	−7	Playoff	(Canada) Rick Todd	
1997		(United States) Garrett Willis			Playoff	(United States) Clark Dennis	
1996		(United States) Jaime Gomez	210 (Note: Shortened to 54 holes due to weather.)	−6	Playoff	(Mexico) Rafael Alarcón (United States) Joe Cioe	
1983–1995: No tournament
1982		(United States) George Burns	275				
1981		(United States) Curtis Strange	204				
1980		(United States) Bruce Fleisher	267				
1979		(United States) Butch Baird (3) (United States) Chi-Chi Rodríguez	267		Title shared (Note: Title shared when darkness ended play with Baird and Rodríguez still tied after two holes of a sudden-death playoff.)		
1975–1978: No tournament
1974		(Argentina) Roberto De Vicenzo (5)	265	−23	7 strokes	(Argentina) Florentino Molina	
1973		(Argentina) Roberto De Vicenzo (4)	271	−17	8 strokes	(England) Peter Oosterhuis	
1972		(Taiwan) Lu Liang-Huan	279	−9	2 strokes	(Colombia) Rogelio González (Brazil) Luis Carlos Pinto	
1971		(Argentina) Roberto De Vicenzo (3)	273	−15	4 strokes	(England) Peter Townsend	
1970		(United States) Herb Hooper	275	−13	2 strokes	(United States) Jay Dolan	
1969		(United States) Butch Baird (2)	276	−12	Playoff	(Colombia) Rogelio González (United States) Bob Ross	
1968		(United States) Butch Baird	267	−21	11 strokes	(United States) Wes Ellis (Argentina) Vicente Fernández	
1967		(United States) Bert Weaver	274	−14	3 strokes	(United States) Art Wall Jr.	
1966		(Canada) Wilf Homenuik	283	−5	1 stroke	(United States) Stan Mosel	
1965		(United States) Art Wall Jr.	277	−11	4 strokes	(United States) Wes Ellis	
1964: No tournament
1963		(Canada) George Knudson	280	−8	4 strokes	(United States) Joe Jimenez (United States) Ernie Vossler	
1962		(United States) Jim Ferree	277	−11	1 stroke	(United States) Billy Maxwell	
1961		(United States) Pete Cooper (2)	273	−15	5 strokes	(United States) Ernie Vossler	
1960		(United States) Ernie Vossler	269	−19	3 strokes	(United States) Dow Finsterwald	
1959		(United States) Pete Cooper	274	−14	3 strokes	(United States) Don January	
1958		(United States) Bob Watson	271	−17	1 stroke	(United States) Art Wall Jr.	
1957		(United States) Doug Ford	277	−11	2 strokes	(United States) Dow Finsterwald	
1956		(United States) Arnold Palmer	283	−5	Playoff	(United States) Sam Snead	
1955		(Argentina) Antonio Cerdá	273	−15	1 stroke	(Argentina) Roberto De Vicenzo (United States) Arnold Palmer	
1954		(United States) Sam Snead	271	−17	6 strokes	(Argentina) Roberto De Vicenzo	
1953		(Argentina) Roberto De Vicenzo (2)	274	−14	3 strokes	(United States) Charlie Harper (United States) Clayton Heafner (United States) Sam Snead	
1952		(Argentina) Roberto De Vicenzo	282	−6	3 strokes	(United States) Sam Snead	
1951		(United States) Johnny MacMurray (a) (4)	284	−4	3 strokes	(Colombia) Raúl Posse (United States) Gene Kunes (United States) Harvey Breaux (a)	
1950		(Colombia) Raúl Posse	284				
1949		(United States) Johnny MacMurray (a) (3)	288				
1948		(United States) Johnny MacMurray (a) (2)	283				
1947		(United States) Herb Mitten (a)	293				
1946		(United States) Charlie Grant	299				
1945		(United States) Tony Tiso (2)	291				
1944		(United States) Marion Reid (a)	299				
1943		(United States) Tony Tiso (2)	291				
1942		(United States) Lou Barbaro	297				
1941		(United States) Al Escalante	298				
1940		(United States) Johnny MacMurray (a)	301				
1939		(United States) Jimmy Vincent (2)	301				
1939		(United States) Jimmy Vincent	304				

== See also ==
- Open golf tournament
- Panama Championship
