= Costa Rica Open =

Men's professional golf tournament

Kai Fieberg Costa Rica Open
Tournament information
- Location: San José, Costa Rica
- Established: 2002
- Course: Cariari Country Club
- Par: 71
- Length: 6,577 yards (6,014 m)
- Tours: Tour de las Américas; Challenge Tour
- Format: Stroke play
- Prize fund: US$175,000
- Month played: February
- Final year: 2007

Tournament record score
- Aggregate: 275 Miguel Rodríguez (2007)
- To par: −9 as above

Final champion
- (Argentina) Miguel Rodríguez
- Location in Costa Rica

The Costa Rica Open is a men's professional golf tournament that was played annually in Costa Rica until 2007. It was an event on the Tour de las Americas from 2002 until its replacement by the Costa Rica Golf Classic in 2008, and was also co-sanctioned by the European Challenge Tour from 2003.

The tournament was held at the Cariari Country Club near San José every year except in 2004 when it was played over the Valle del Sol Golf Course near Santa Ana. The 2006 event was renamed in order to pay tribute to the tournaments founder and promoter, Kai Fieberg, who had been killed in a car accident earlier in the year.

In 1979 and 1980, Cariari hosted the PGA sponsored Friendship Cup, which is sometimes also referred to as the Costa Rica Open. These tournaments were won by Raymond Floyd and Larry Ziegler.

== Winners ==
Year	Tour(s) (Note: CHA − Challenge Tour; TLA − Tour de las Américas.)	Winner	Score	To par	Margin of victory	Runner(s)-up
Kai Fieberg Costa Rica Open
2007	CHA, TLA	(Argentina) Miguel Rodríguez	275	−9	1 stroke	(Argentina) Juan Abbate (Argentina) Gustavo Acosta
2006	CHA, TLA	(Sweden) Johan Axgren	277	−7	Playoff	(Sweden) Alex Norén
American Express Costa Rica Open
2005	CHA, TLA	(United States) Kyle Dobbs	280	−4	Playoff	(Argentina) Sebastián Fernández
Costa Rica Open
2004	CHA, TLA	(Italy) Alessandro Tadini	278	−6	Playoff	(Spain) Carlos Quevedo
Credomatic MasterCard Costa Rica Open
2003	CHA, TLA	(Argentina) Sebastián Fernández	278	−6	Playoff	(Argentina) César Monasterio
American Express Costa Rica Open
2002	TLA	(Argentina) Rafael Gómez	289	+5	Playoff	(Paraguay) Marco Ruiz

== See also ==
- Open golf tournament
