= 2007 Challenge Tour =

Golf tour season

2007 Challenge Tour season
- Duration: 30 November 2006 – 27 October 2007
- Number of official events: 32 (Note: One further tournament was scheduled but was removed from the schedule.)
- Most wins: (Chile) Felipe Aguilar (2) (England) Peter Baker (2) (England) Robert Dinwiddie (2) (Netherlands) Joost Luiten (2) (England) Ross McGowan (2) (Italy) Edoardo Molinari (2) (England) Iain Pyman (2) (Scotland) Peter Whiteford (2)
- Rankings: (France) Mike Lorenzo-Vera

The 2007 Challenge Tour was the 19th season of the Challenge Tour, the official development tour to the European Tour.

== Changes for 2007 ==
Five new tournaments were added to the schedule, including the Club Colombia Masters, the Dutch Futures, the Open AGF-Allianz Côtes d'Armor Bretagne, the Doc Salbe PGA European Challenge in Germany and the Toscana Open Italian Federation Cup.

== Schedule ==
The following table lists official events during the 2007 season.

Date	Tournament	Host country	Purse (€)	Winner (Note: The number in brackets after each winner's name is the number of Challenge Tour events they had won up to and including that tournament. This information is only shown for Challenge Tour members. It is rare for someone to accumulate many wins on the Challenge Tour as success at this level usually leads to promotion to the European Tour.)	OWGR points	Other tours (Note: ARG − PGA of Argentina Tour; EUR − European Tour; NGL − Nordic Golf League; TLA − Tour de las Américas.)	Notes
3 Dec	Abierto Visa de la República	Argentina	US$200,000	(Argentina) Rafael Echenique (2)	12	ARG, TLA	
10 Dec	Abierto Mexicano Corona	Mexico	US$310,000	(Paraguay) Fabrizio Zanotti (1)	12	TLA	
4 Feb	Club Colombia Masters	Colombia	US$175,000	(Italy) Edoardo Molinari (1)	12	TLA	New tournament
11 Feb	Kai Fieberg Costa Rica Open	Costa Rica	US$175,000	(Argentina) Miguel Rodríguez (1)	12	TLA	
18 Feb	Abierto Telefónica de Guatemala	Guatemala	US$150,000	(Wales) Jamie Donaldson (3)	12	TLA	
11 Mar	Tusker Kenya Open	Kenya	160,000	(Italy) Edoardo Molinari (2)	12		
22 Apr	Tessali-Metaponto Open di Puglia e Basilicata	Italy	130,000	(Northern Ireland) Michael Hoey (2)	12		
~~6 May~~	Moroccan Classic	Morocco	–	Removed	–		
13 May	A.G.F. Allianz Golf Open de Toulouse	France	130,000	(Netherlands) Joost Luiten (1)	12		
20 May	Telenet Trophy	Belgium	130,000	(Belgium) Nicolas Vanhootegem (3)	12		
27 May	Open Mahou de Madrid	Spain	130,000	(England) Ben Mason (1)	12		
3 Jun	Oceânico Developments Pro-Am Challenge	England	100,000	(England) Ross McGowan (1)	12		
10 Jun	Vodafone Challenge	Germany	130,000	(Netherlands) Joost Luiten (2)	12		
17 Jun	Open de Saint-Omer	France	500,000	(Spain) Carl Suneson (6)	18	EUR	
24 Jun	Credit Suisse Challenge	Switzerland	140,000	(England) Peter Baker (1)	12		
1 Jul	Estoril Challenge de Portugal	Portugal	130,000	(England) Ross McGowan (2)	12		
8 Jul	AGF-Allianz Open des Volcans – Challenge de France	France	130,000	(New Zealand) Gareth Paddison (1)	12		
22 Jul	MAN NÖ Open	Austria	130,000	(Denmark) Anders Schmidt Hansen (1)	12		
29 Jul	Firstplus Wales Challenge	Wales	130,000	(Republic of Ireland) Colm Moriarty (1)	12		
5 Aug	Challenge of Ireland	Ireland	150,000	(Sweden) Magnus A. Carlsson (1)	12		
12 Aug	Scottish Challenge	Scotland	200,000	(England) Robert Dinwiddie (1)	12		
19 Aug	Rolex Trophy	Switzerland	210,000	(England) Robert Dinwiddie (2)	12		
19 Aug	Lexus Open	Norway	130,000	(Austria) Martin Wiegele (1)	12		
26 Aug	Postbank Challenge	Germany	140,000	(Chile) Felipe Aguilar (1)	12		
2 Sep	ECCO Tour Championship	Denmark	130,000	(England) Iain Pyman (6)	12	NGL	
9 Sep	Telia Challenge Waxholm	Sweden	SKr 1,175,000	(England) Iain Pyman (7)	12		
16 Sep	OKI Mahou Challenge de España	Spain	130,000	(Chile) Felipe Aguilar (2)	12		
23 Sep	Kazakhstan Open	Kazakhstan	330,000	(Sweden) Leif Westerberg (2)	12		
30 Sep	Dutch Futures	Netherlands	140,000	(Scotland) Peter Whiteford (1)	12		New tournament
7 Oct	Open AGF-Allianz Côtes d'Armor Bretagne	France	140,000	(England) Peter Baker (2)	12		New to Challenge Tour
14 Oct	Doc Salbe PGA European Challenge	Germany	140,000	(Scotland) Peter Whiteford (2)	12		New tournament
20 Oct	Toscana Open Italian Federation Cup	Italy	140,000	(Sweden) Mikael Lundberg (3)	12		New tournament
27 Oct	Apulia San Domenico Grand Final	Italy	250,000	(France) Mike Lorenzo-Vera (1)	12		Tour Championship

== Rankings ==
The rankings were based on prize money won during the season, calculated in Euros. The top 20 players on the rankings earned status to play on the 2008 European Tour.

Rank	Player	Prize money (€)
1	(France) Mike Lorenzo-Vera	128,927
2	(England) Ross McGowan	126,645
3	(Chile) Felipe Aguilar	120,409
4	(Wales) Jamie Donaldson	111,748
5	(Sweden) Leif Westerberg	102,323
