= 2012 Tour de las Américas =

Golf tour season

2012 Tour de las Américas season
- Duration: 15 March 2012 – 3 June 2012
- Number of official events: 6
- Most wins: (Paraguay) Marco Ruiz (2)
- Order of Merit: (Paraguay) Marco Ruiz

The 2012 Tour de las Américas was the 21st and final season of the Tour de las Américas (formerly the South American Tour), the main professional golf tour in Latin America since it was formed in 1991.

== Final season ==
The 2012 season proved to be the last season of the Tour de las Américas, as it was superseded by PGA Tour Latinoamérica, which began in September 2012.

== Schedule ==
The following table lists official events during the 2012 season.

Date	Tournament	Host country	Purse (US$)	Winner (Note: The number in brackets after each winner's name is the number of Tour de las Américas events they had won up to and including that tournament.)	OWGR points	Other tours (Note: TPG − TPG Tour.)
18 Mar	Abierto de Golf Los Lirios	Chile	40,000	(Argentina) Julián Etulain (4)	6	
25 Mar	International Open La Vitalicia	Venezuela	120,000	(Colombia) Rafael Romero (1)	6	
15 Apr	Abierto del Centro	Argentina	Arg$350,000	(Argentina) César Costilla (3)	6	TPG
19 May	Abierto del Nordeste	Argentina	Arg$280,000	(Argentina) Luciano Dodda (2)	6	TPG
27 May	Televisa TLA Players Championship	Mexico	70,000	(Paraguay) Marco Ruiz (3)	n/a	
3 Jun	Taca Airlines Open	Peru	50,000	(Paraguay) Marco Ruiz (4)	6	

=== Unofficial events ===
The following events were sanctioned by the Tour de las Américas, but did not carry official money, nor were wins official.

Date	Tournament	Host country	Purse ($)	Winners	OWGR points
30 Mar	Challenge Latinoamericano Copa La Vitalicia	Venezuela	64,000	Team Venezuela	n/a

== Order of Merit ==
The Order of Merit was based on tournament results during the season, calculated using a points-based system. The top 10 players on the Order of Merit earned status to play on the 2012 PGA Tour Latinoamérica.

Position	Player	Points
1	(Paraguay) Marco Ruiz	26,884
2	(Colombia) Rafael Romero	22,060
3	(Puerto Rico) Rafael Campos	17,588
4	(Argentina) Julián Etulain	16,258
5	(Argentina) Daniel Barbetti	13,574
