= David Higgins (golfer) =

Irish professional golfer (born 1972)

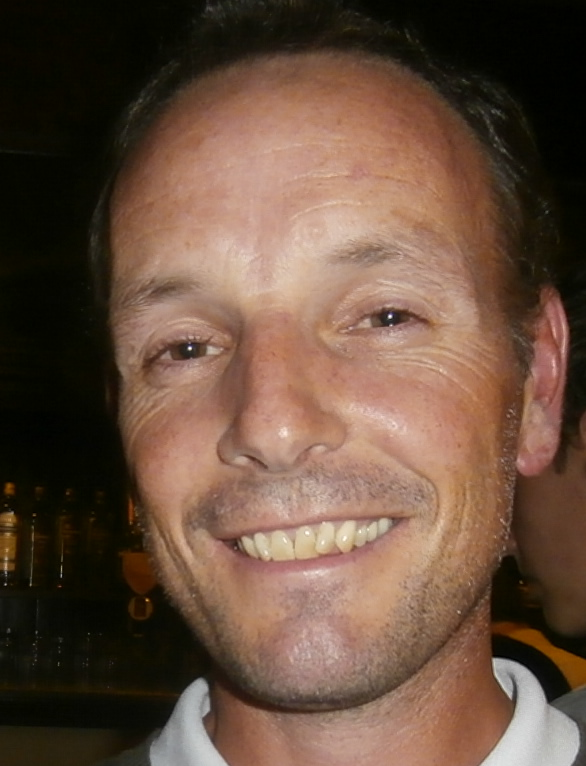

Personal information
- Full name: David William Higgins
- Nationality: Ireland
- Born: 1 December 1972 (age 53) Cork, Ireland
- Height: 1.78 m (5 ft 10 in)
- Weight: 76 kg (168 lb; 12.0 st)

Career
- Sport: Golf
- Turned professional: 1994
- Former tours: European Tour; Challenge Tour
- Professional wins: 8

Number of wins by tour
- Challenge Tour: 3
- Other: 5

Best results in major championships
- Masters Tournament: DNP
- PGA Championship: DNP
- U.S. Open: DNP
- The Open Championship: CUT: 2007, 2009

David William Higgins (born 1 December 1972) is an Irish professional golfer.

== Early life and amateur career ==
In 1972, Higgins was born in Cork, Ireland. He is the son of European Seniors Tour golfer Liam Higgins.

Higgins was the country's leading amateur by the time he reached 21. Higgins earned match play victories over Pádraig Harrington in the finals of the South of Ireland and the Irish Amateur Close championships.

== Professional career ==
In 1994, Higgins turned professional. He earned £67,000 in his rookie season on the European Tour in 1996 to finish just inside the top 100 on the Order of Merit. In 1997 he broke his left wrist and right elbow in a horse riding accident. On his return, he failed to immediately rediscover his form and dropped down to the second tier Challenge Tour in 1999.

In 2000 Higgins won three times on the Challenge Tour, and finished 2nd on the end of season Rankings, to graduate back to the European Tour for the following season. He failed to make an impact at the highest level and returned to the Challenge Tour in 2005. He again found success, finishing 12th on the rankings to earn another shot at the European Tour, but he was unable to maintain that form, again losing his card at the end of 2007.

== Amateur wins ==
- 1989 Irish Boys Championship
- 1994 Irish Amateur Close Championship, South of Ireland Championship

== Professional wins (8) ==
=== Challenge Tour wins (3) ===
No.	Date	Tournament	Winning score	Margin of victory	Runner-up
1	11 Jun 2000	NCC Open	−10 (69-70-64-71=274)	3 strokes	(Sweden) Martin Erlandsson
2	23 Jul 2000	Günther Hamburg Classic	−18 (69-69-68-64=270)	Playoff	(Spain) Carlos Rodiles
3	27 Aug 2000	Rolex Trophy	−17 (70-66-66-69=271)	4 strokes	(Venezuela) Carlos Larraín

Challenge Tour playoff record (1–1)

No.	Year	Tournament	Opponent	Result
1	2000	Günther Hamburg Classic	(Spain) Carlos Rodiles	Won with birdie on first extra hole
2	2005	Abierto Telefónica Moviles de Guatemala	(Argentina) César Monasterio	Lost to par on first extra hole

=== Other wins (5) ===
- 1995 PGA Ulster Open Championship
- 2012 Irish PGA Championship
- 2016 Titleist & FootJoy PGA Professional Championship
- 2021 Irish PGA Championship
- 2023 Irish PGA Championship

== Results in major championships ==
Tournament	2007	2008	2009
The Open Championship	CUT		CUT

Note: Higgins only played in The Open Championship.

Did not play

CUT = missed the half-way cut

== Team appearances ==
Professional

- PGA Cup (representing Great Britain and Ireland): 2017 (winners), 2022

== See also ==
- 2005 Challenge Tour graduates
- 2012 European Tour Qualifying School graduates
