= Julián Etulain =

Argentine golfer

Personal information
- Full name: Julián Oscar Etulain
- Nickname: Tula
- Nationality: Argentina
- Born: 21 June 1988 (age 38) Coronel Suárez, Argentina
- Height: 1.72 m (5 ft 8 in)
- Weight: 71 kg (157 lb; 11.2 st)
- Spouse: Marina Graff (m. 2022)

Career
- Sport: Golf
- Turned professional: 2008
- Current tours: Korn Ferry Tour; TPG Tour
- Former tours: PGA Tour; PGA Tour Latinoamérica; Tour de las Américas
- Professional wins: 13

Number of wins by tour
- Korn Ferry Tour: 1
- Other: 12

Best results in major championships
- Masters Tournament: DNP
- PGA Championship: DNP
- U.S. Open: CUT: 2019
- The Open Championship: DNP

Achievements and awards
- Tour de las Américas Order of Merit winner: 2010
- PGA Tour Latinoamérica Order of Merit winner: 2014

Julián Oscar Etulain (born 21 June 1988) is an Argentine professional golfer who plays on the Korn Ferry Tour.

== Amateur career ==
Before turning professional in 2008, Etulain had won the Argentine Amateur Championship and had represented Argentina at a number of events including the 2008 Eisenhower Trophy.

== Professional career ==
In 2009, Etulain was named as the Tour de las Américas Rookie of the Year in his first full season as a professional golfer. Following this, he had a successful 2010 with two wins on the Tour de las Américas and finishing at the top of the Tour de las Americas Order of Merit. In 2011, he won a further two times on the Tour de las Americas finishing fifth on the Order of Merit and in doing so earned his 2012 PGA Tour Latinoamérica card.

In 2013, Etulian won the Lexus Peru Open on PGA Tour Latinoamérica and finished in sixth place on the Order of Merit. Following this, Etulian was able to gain conditional status on the Web.com Tour for 2014.

During 2014 Etulain continued to play on PGA Tour Latinoamérica, and in May won his second title at the Lexus Panama Classic. He then successfully defended the Lexus Peru Open in October. In doing so Etulain became the first golfer to successfully defend a tournament on PGA Tour Latinoamérica and the first three-time winner on the tour. He also finished second at the TransAmerican Power Products CRV Open and third at the Dominican Republic Open and Mazatlán Open. This earned him US$92,394 and the PGA Tour Latinoamérica Order of Merit.

In 2015, Etulain finished in second place at the Brasil Champions, ninth at the News Sentinel Open and tenth at the Stonebrae Classic. He finished 39th in the Web.com Tour regular season, but had poor results in the Finals and did not get a PGA Tour card. In 2016, he claimed a second place at the Chitimacha Louisiana Open and two sixth places at the Rex Hospital Open and Nashville Golf Open, finishing 20th in the regular season money list. During the Web.com Tour finals, he claimed a second-place finish at the DAP Championship, therefore he finished ninth in the overall money list, earning a PGA Tour card for the 2017 season.

== Amateur wins ==
- Argentine Amateur Championship

== Professional wins (13) ==
=== Web.com Tour wins (1) ===
No.	Date	Tournament	Winning score	Margin of victory	Runner-up
1	25 Mar 2018	Chitimacha Louisiana Open	−19 (62-70-66-67=265)	2 strokes	(United States) Taylor Moore

Web.com Tour playoff record (0–1)

No.	Year	Tournament	Opponents	Result
1	2016	DAP Championship	(United States) Bryson DeChambeau, (United States) Andres Gonzales, (United States) Nicholas Lindheim	DeChambeau won with par on second extra hole Etulain and Lindheim eliminated by birdie on first hole

=== PGA Tour Latinoamérica wins (4) ===
No.	Date	Tournament	Winning score	Margin of victory	Runner(s)-up
1	10 Nov 2013	Lexus Peru Open	−13 (68-70-67-70=275)	1 stroke	(United States) Ryan Blaum, (United States) Bronson Burgoon
2	25 May 2014	Lexus Panama Classic	−17 (69-67-66-69=271)	2 strokes	(Argentina) Gato Zarlenga
3	2 Nov 2014	Lexus Peru Open (2)	−14 (69-65-68-72=274)	3 strokes	(United States) Robert Rohanna, (Argentina) Sebastián Saavedra
4	12 Nov 2017	NEC Argentina Classic	−19 (66-67-67-69=269)	1 stroke	(United States) Colin Featherstone, (United States) Jared Wolfe

=== Tour de las Américas wins (4) ===
No.	Date	Tournament	Winning score	Margin of victory	Runner(s)-up
1	1 Aug 2010	Abierto de Colombia	−21 (65-72-63-67=267)	3 strokes	(Argentina) Rodolfo González, (Colombia) David Vanegas
2	17 Oct 2010	Abierto Internacional de Golf Hacienda Chicureo	−9 (71-71-69-67=279)	Playoff	(Argentina) Agustín Jauretche
3	22 May 2011	Televisa TLA Players Championship	−21 (66-63-60=189)	6 strokes	(Argentina) César Costilla
4	18 Mar 2012	Abierto de Golf Los Lirios	−15 (64-72-70-67=273)	3 strokes	(Argentina) Julio Zapata

=== TPG Tour wins (1) ===
No.	Date	Tournament	Winning score	Margin of victory	Runner-up
1	28 Jan 2024	Abierto del Sur	−11 (68-66-74-61=269)	Playoff	(Argentina) Marcos Montenegro

=== Chilean Tour wins (1) ===
No.	Date	Tournament	Winning score	Margin of victory	Runner-up
1	18 Mar 2012	Abierto Los Lirios	−15 (64-72-70-67=273)	3 strokes	(Argentina) Julio Zapata

=== PGA Tour Latinoamérica Developmental Series wins (1) ===
No.	Date	Tournament	Winning score	Margin of victory	Runners-up
1	18 Mar 2023	Abierto de Venezuela	−8 (66-65-71-70=272)	9 strokes	(Chile) Toto Gana, (Venezuela) Santiago Quintero

=== Other wins (1) ===
- 2010 Abierto del Club Militar en Bogotá (Colombian Tour)

== Team appearances ==
- Eisenhower Trophy (representing Argentina): 2008

== See also ==
- 2016 Web.com Tour Finals graduates
- 2018 Web.com Tour Finals graduates
