= Rafael Echenique =

Argentine golfer

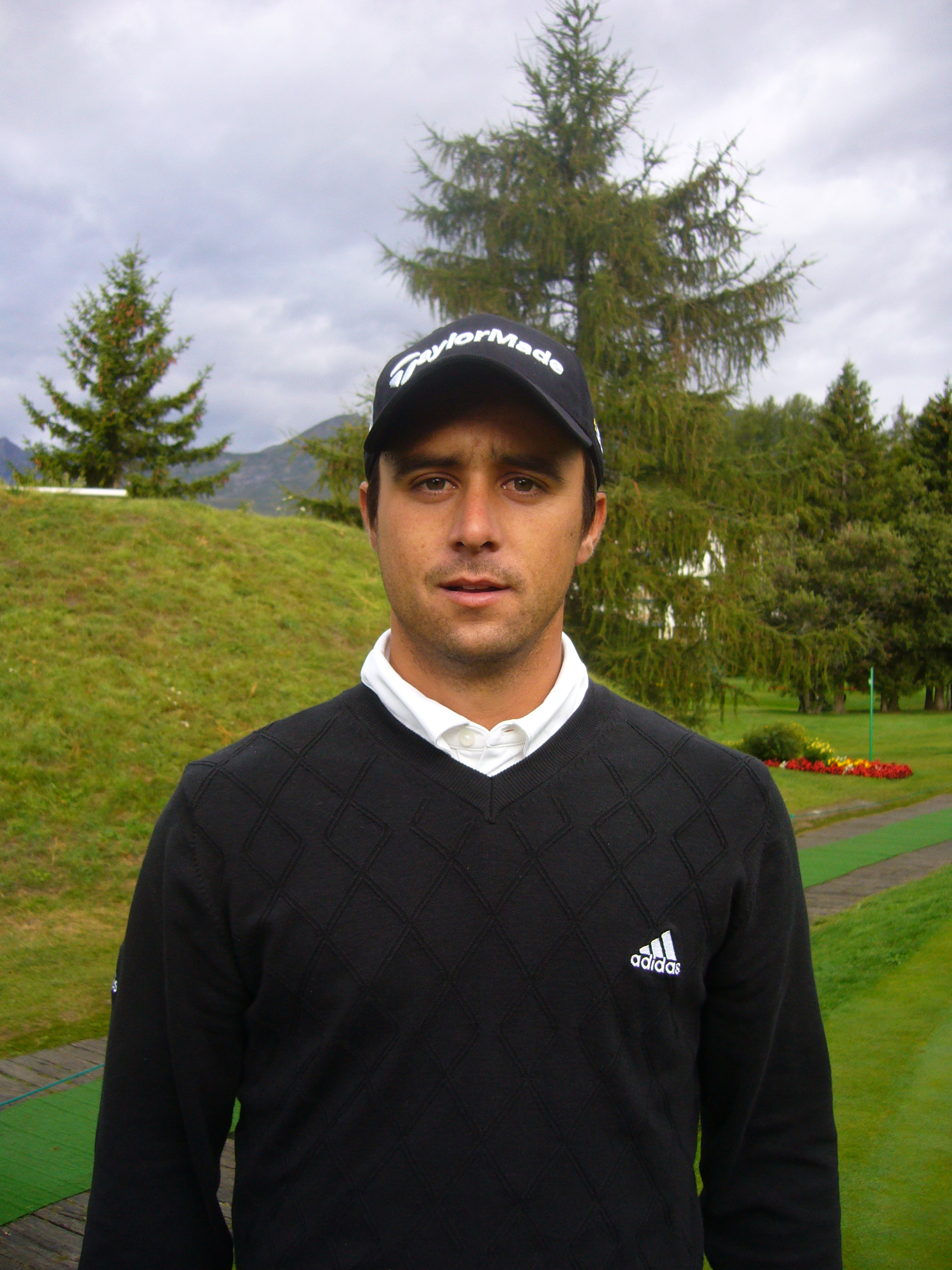

Personal information
- Full name: Rafael Echenique
- Nationality: Argentina
- Born: 18 October 1980 (age 46) San Luis, Argentina
- Height: 5 ft 8 in (1.73 m)
- Weight: 158 lb (72 kg; 11.3 st)
- Spouse: Marina (m. 2005)
- Children: 1

Career
- Sport: Golf
- Turned professional: 1999
- Current tour: PGA Tour Latinoamérica
- Former tours: European Tour; Challenge Tour
- Professional wins: 7

Number of wins by tour
- Challenge Tour: 2
- Other: 5

Best results in major championships
- Masters Tournament: DNP
- PGA Championship: DNP
- U.S. Open: CUT: 2010
- The Open Championship: T45: 2012

Rafael Echenique (born 18 October 1980) is an Argentine professional golfer.

== Early life and amateur career ==
Echenique was born in 1980 in San Luis, Argentina. He won the Argentine Amateur Rankings in 1997/98.

== Professional career ==
In 1999, Echenique turned pro. Having failed to gain a place on the European Tour via the qualifying school on four occasions, he finally won a card on the main tour by virtue of finishing seventh on the 2006 Challenge Tour, helped by winning the Telia Challenge Waxholm in Sweden. He also finished second in the Apulia San Domenico Grand Final. Later that year he won the biggest title of his career, the Argentine Open in his home country.

Echenique's first year on the European Tour was highlighted by a second-place finish in the TCL Classic as he just did enough to retain his playing privileges for the following season. In 2008, a tie for fourth in the Celtic Manor Wales Open and seventh in the Omega European Masters, along with several other top twenty finishes, enabled him to sit more comfortably in 90th place on the Order of Merit. He was second in the 2000 Llao Llao Match Play, and the 2004 Argentine PGA Championship.

Echenique achieved the biggest result of his career at the 2009 BMW International Open, finishing runner-up to Nick Dougherty. Moving through the field on the final day, Echenique carded a final-round 10-under-par 62, which included an albatross at the par-5 18th hole, contributing to a European Tour record back-nine score of 27.

== Amateur wins ==
- 1997 Los Andes Cup
- 1998 Center Open (Argentina), Junior World Championship (individual winner) (Japan)

== Professional wins (7) ==
=== Challenge Tour wins (2) ===
No.	Date	Tournament	Winning score	Margin of victory	Runner(s)-up
1	3 Sep 2006	Telia Challenge Waxholm	−22 (65-68-66-71=270)	2 strokes	(Germany) Martin Kaymer
2	3 Dec 2006 (2007 season)	Abierto Visa de la República^{1}	−7 (73-70-66-68=277)	1 stroke	(Argentina) Ángel Cabrera, (Argentina) Ricardo González

^{1}Co-sanctioned by the Tour de las Américas and the PGA of Argentina Tour

=== Tour de las Américas wins (1) ===
No.	Date	Tournament	Winning score	Margin of victory	Runners-up
1	3 Dec 2006	Abierto Visa de la República^{1}	−7 (73-70-66-68=277)	1 stroke	(Argentina) Ángel Cabrera, (Argentina) Ricardo González

^{1}Co-sanctioned by the Challenge Tour and the PGA of Argentina Tour

=== TPG Tour wins (2) ===
No.	Date	Tournament	Winning score	Margin of victory	Runner-up
1	4 Nov 2007	Abierto de Mendoza	−10 (69-73-66-66=274)	Playoff	(Argentina) Rubén Alvarez
2	31 Jan 2021	Gran Premio El Moro	−11 (64-65=129)	1 stroke	(Argentina) Martín Contini

=== Argentine wins (3) ===
- 2001 Llao Llao Match Play
- 2004 Salta Open
- 2014 Bridgestone America's Golf Cup (with Emilio Domínguez)

== Team appearances ==
Amateur

- Los Andes Cup: 1997 (winners)
- Eisenhower Trophy (representing Argentina): 1998

Professional

- World Cup (representing Argentina): 2009

== See also ==
- 2006 Challenge Tour graduates
- 2016 European Tour Qualifying School graduates
