= Richard McEvoy =

English golfer (born 1979)

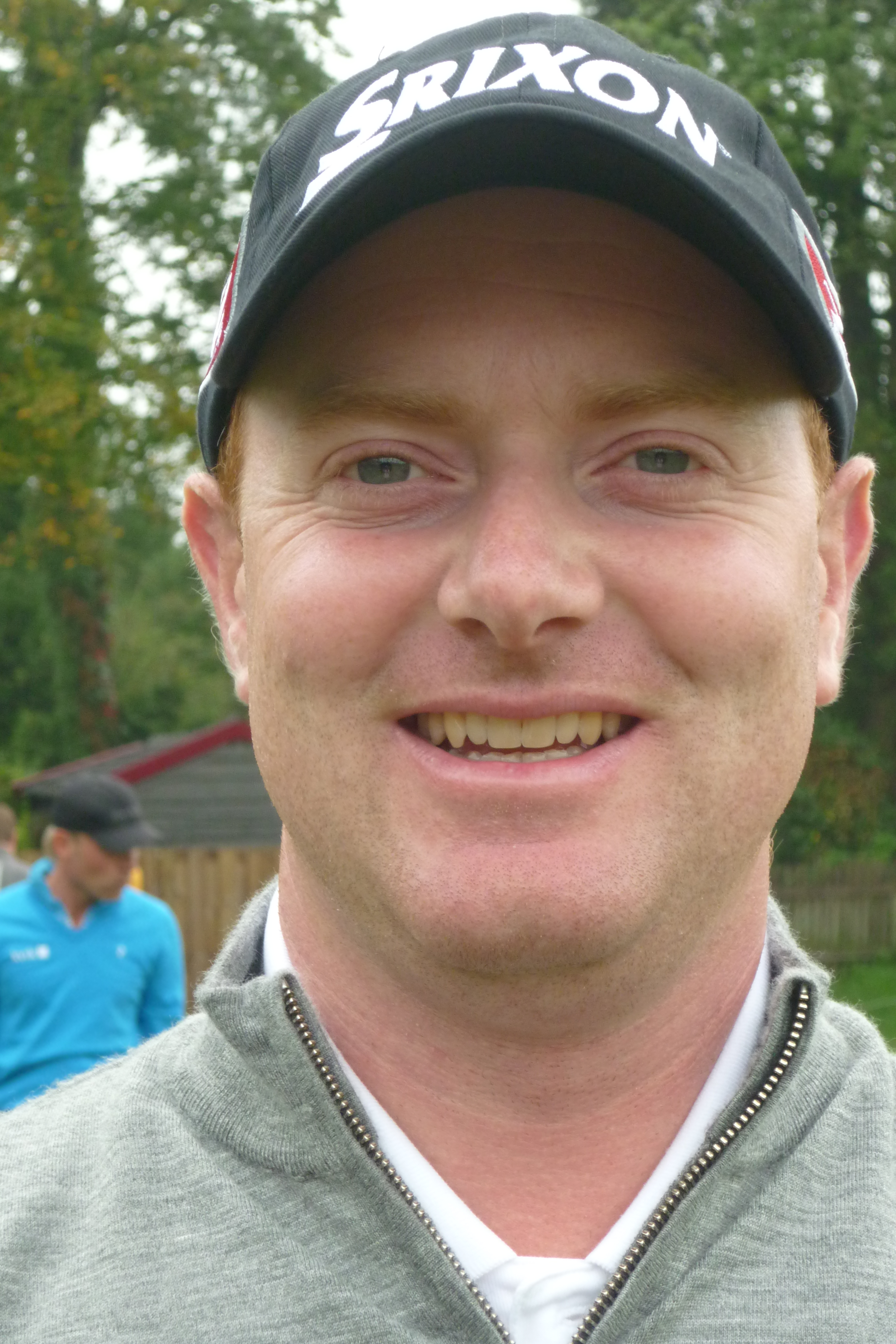

Personal information
- Nationality: England
- Born: 13 June 1979 (age 47) Shoeburyness, England
- Height: 5 ft 10 in (1.78 m)

Career
- Sport: Golf
- Turned professional: 2001
- Current tour: European Tour
- Former tour: Challenge Tour
- Professional wins: 6

Number of wins by tour
- European Tour: 1
- Challenge Tour: 3
- Other: 2

Best results in major championships
- Masters Tournament: DNP
- PGA Championship: DNP
- U.S. Open: DNP
- The Open Championship: T48: 2011

Richard McEvoy (born 13 June 1979) is an English professional golfer who plays on the European Tour. In July 2018, he had his third Challenge Tour win, the Le Vaudreuil Golf Challenge and then won the Porsche European Open, on the European Tour, the following week.

== Amateur career ==
McEvoy's amateur wins included the 2001 Lytham Trophy, and the 2001 Irish Amateur Open Championship. He was a member of the 2001 Great Britain & Ireland Walker Cup team, and turned professional at the end of the year.

== Professional career ==
McEvoy won two third-tier PGA EuroPro Tour events in 2002, before gaining a European Tour card at the 2003 final qualifying school where he was also medalist. He has played several seasons on the tour, but never made enough money in a season to retain his card, until 2010. He regained privileges via the second tier Challenge Tour Rankings in 2005, having won the Panasonic Panama Open during that season, qualifying school in 2006 and through the Challenge Tour again in 2009.

McEvoy's victory at the 2018 Porsche European Open came in his 285th European Tour start and only after he birdied the last hole. He was the first since Martin Wiegele in 2010 to follow a Challenge Tour win with a European Tour win. Prior to his win, McEvoy had never finished better than 3rd in an event or 101st in the Race to Dubai, only kept his European Tour Card twice, and had gone to Q school 12 times during his 17-year professional career.

== Amateur wins ==
- 2001 Lytham Trophy, Irish Amateur Open Championship

== Professional wins (6) ==
=== European Tour wins (1) ===
No.	Date	Tournament	Winning score	Margin of victory	Runners-up
1	29 Jul 2018	Porsche European Open	−11 (70-65-69-73=277)	1 stroke	(Sweden) Christofer Blomstrand, (Germany) Allen John (a), (Italy) Renato Paratore

=== Challenge Tour wins (3) ===
No.	Date	Tournament	Winning score	Margin of victory	Runner-up
1	5 Dec 2004 (2005 season)	Panasonic Panama Open^{1}	−11 (67-72-71-67=277)	1 stroke	(Paraguay) Marco Ruiz
2	2 Jul 2017	SSE Scottish Hydro Challenge	−16 (70-65-67-66=268)	4 strokes	(England) James Heath
3	22 Jul 2018	Le Vaudreuil Golf Challenge	−18 (64-66-68-68=266)	2 strokes	(England) Steven Tiley

^{1}Co-sanctioned by the Tour de las Américas

=== PGA EuroPro Tour wins (2) ===
No.	Date	Tournament	Winning score	Margin of victory	Runners-up
1	24 May 2002	Quinta da Marinha Oitavos Golfe Open	−3 (73-67-70=210)	2 strokes	(Scotland) Peter Whiteford, (England) Tom Whitehouse
2	5 Jul 2002	Owston Hall Challenge	−12 (66-66-72=204)	3 strokes	(England) Simon Griffiths, (England) Darren Prosser, (England) Scott Stevens

== Results in major championships ==
Tournament	2011	2012	2013
Masters Tournament			
U.S. Open			
The Open Championship	T48		CUT
PGA Championship			

Did not play

CUT = missed the half-way cut
"T" = tied for place

== Team appearances ==
Amateur

- European Youths' Team Championship (representing England): 2000 (winners)
- European Amateur Team Championship (representing England): 2001
- Walker Cup (representing Great Britain & Ireland): 2001 (winners)

== See also ==
- 2005 Challenge Tour graduates
- 2006 European Tour Qualifying School graduates
- 2009 Challenge Tour graduates
- 2012 European Tour Qualifying School graduates
- 2014 European Tour Qualifying School graduates
- 2015 European Tour Qualifying School graduates
- 2016 European Tour Qualifying School graduates
