= Raúl Fretes =

Paraguayan golfer

Personal information
- Full name: Raúl Fretes
- Nationality: Paraguay
- Born: 13 September 1965 (age 61) Asunción, Paraguay
- Spouse: Grace Jara
- Children: 4

Career
- Sport: Golf
- Turned professional: 1990
- Former tours: Asia Golf Circuit; Buy.com Tour; Tour de las Américas
- Professional wins: 19

Raúl Fretes (born 13 September 1965) is a Paraguayan professional golfer.

== Career ==
In 1965, Fretes was born in Asunción.

He turned pro in 1990. He won the South American Tour Order of Merit in 1994 and 1998. He won the 2005 World Golf Teachers Cup. Fretes played on the Tour de las Américas and his best finish was second in the TLA Players Championship in 2003 and the Center Open in 2007.

== Professional wins (19) ==
=== Asia Golf Circuit wins (1) ===
No.	Date	Tournament	Winning score	Margin of victory	Runner-up
1	30 Apr 1995	Volvo China Open	−11 (74-67-68-68=277)	3 strokes	(Taiwan) Lai Ying-juh

=== Tour de las Américas wins (8) ===
- 1992 Los Inkas Peru Open
- 1993 Paraguay Open
- 1994 Uruguay Open
- 1995 Los Inkas Peru Open
- 1998 Argentine Masters, Argentine Open
- 2000–01 Masters Mexicano de Golf
- 2001–02 Bavaria Paraguay Open

=== Argentine wins (3) ===
- 1991 Mendoza Open
- 1999 Misiones Open
- 2000 Misiones Open

=== Other wins (7) ===
- 1994 Chile Open, Los Leones Open (Chile)
- 1995 Callaway Cup (Paraguay)
- 2001 Srixon Championship (USA, Montgomery Tour)
- 2002 Rio Grande Open (Brazil)
- 2005 Carlos Franco Invitational
- 2008 Golf Tour 5 Tournament (Brazil)

== Team appearances ==
Amateur

- Eisenhower Trophy (representing Paraguay): 1986
- Los Andes Cup (South American Cup): 1989

Professional

- Alfred Dunhill Cup (representing Paraguay): 1993, 1994, 1999
- World Cup (representing Paraguay): 1992, 1997, 1999
