= Guatemala Open =

Abierto Telefónica de Guatemala
Tournament information
- Location: Guatemala City, Guatemala
- Established: 2002
- Course: Hacienda Nueva Country Club
- Par: 72
- Length: 7,043 yards (6,440 m)
- Tours: Tour de las Américas; Challenge Tour
- Format: Stroke play
- Prize fund: US$150,000
- Month played: February
- Final year: 2007

Tournament record score
- Aggregate: 265 Jamie Donaldson (2007)
- To par: −23 as above

Final champion
- (Wales) Jamie Donaldson
- Location in Guatemala

The Guatemala Open or Abierto de Guatemala is a golf tournament that was on the schedules of the Tour de las Américas and Challenge Tour between 2003 and 2007. It was held at the Hacienda Nueva Country Club in Guatemala City.

== Winners ==
Year	Tours (Note: CHA − Challenge Tour; TLA − Tour de las Américas.)	Winner	Score	To par	Margin of victory	Runner-up
Abierto Telefónica de Guatemala
2007	CHA, TLA	(Wales) Jamie Donaldson	265	−23	1 stroke	(Argentina) Emilio Domínguez
Abierto Movistar Guatemala Open
2006	CHA, TLA	(Argentina) Miguel Ángel Carballo	273	−15	Playoff	(Argentina) Gustavo Rojas
Abierto Telefónica Moviles de Guatemala
2005	CHA, TLA	(Argentina) César Monasterio	269	−19	Playoff	(Republic of Ireland) David Higgins
Abierto Telefónica
2004	CHA, TLA	(Argentina) Daniel Vancsik (2)	272	−16	2 strokes	(Paraguay) Marco Ruiz
Telefónica Centro America Abierto de Guatemala
2003	CHA, TLA	(Argentina) Daniel Vancsik	274	−10	Playoff	(Argentina) Juan Abbate
Tikal Trophy Guatemala Open
2002	TLA	(Argentina) Sebastián Fernández	278	−10	3 strokes	(Argentina) Pablo Del Grosso

== See also ==
- Open golf tournament
