= Gustavo Rojas (golfer) =

Argentine professional golfer

Personal information
- Nationality: Argentina
- Born: 28 September 1967 (age 59) Buenos Aires, Argentina
- Height: 1.75 m (5 ft 9 in)

Career
- Sport: Golf
- Turned professional: 1984
- Former tours: European Tour; Challenge Tour; Tour de las Américas
- Professional wins: 13

Number of wins by tour
- Challenge Tour: 1
- Other: 12

Gustavo Rojas (born 28 September 1967) is an Argentine professional golfer.

== Career ==
Rojas was born in Buenos Aires. He turned professional in 1984. He has had his greatest success in South America on the various Argentine tours and the regional Tour de las Américas. In 2002, he was tied with Ángel Cabrera in the Argentine PGA Championship after 54 holes, but torrential rain meant that the final round was cancelled and the two shared the title.

Rojas has played on the European Tour and its development tour, the Challenge Tour, since 1999. He has struggled to establish himself at the highest level, and has often had to return to the tours qualifying school. His best tournament finishes on the elite tour have been a pair of joint 5th places at the 2000 BMW International Open and the 2001 Via Digital Open de España. On the Challenge Tour he has enjoyed more success, winning the Open dei Tessali in 1999 and having several runners-up finishes, including three losses in playoffs. He ended the 1999 season in 4th place on the Challenge Tour Rankings to graduate to the European Tour for the 2000 season, when he again failed to secure his card. Since 2004 he has competed predominantly on the Challenge Tour.

== Professional wins (13) ==
=== Challenge Tour wins (1) ===
No.	Date	Tournament	Winning score	Margin of victory	Runner-up
1	23 May 1999	Open dei Tessali	−12 (69-68-67-68=272)	2 strokes	(Belgium) Didier de Vooght

Challenge Tour playoff record (0–3)

No.	Year	Tournament	Opponent	Result
1	1999	Volvo Finnish Open	(Sweden) Paul Nilbrink	Lost to par on third extra hole
2	1999	Challenge de France Bayer	(England) Iain Pyman	Lost to birdie on sixth extra hole
2	2006	Abierto Movistar Guatemala Open	(Argentina) Miguel Ángel Carballo	Lost to birdie on first extra hole

=== Argentine wins (6) ===
- 1990 Golfers Grand Prix
- 1995 North Open
- 1999 Santiago del Estero Open, Ranelagh Open
- 2000 Olivos Grand Prix
- 2002 Argentine PGA Championship (tie with Ángel Cabrera)

=== South American wins (6) ===
- 1996 Ecuador Open
- 1997 Ecuador Open, Marbella Open (Chile), Los Leones Open (Chile)
- 1998 Marbella Open (Chile)
- 2006 Posada de la Concepción Open (Chile)
