= Miguel Rodríguez (golfer) =

Argentine golfer

Personal information
- Full name: Miguel Ángel Rodríguez
- Nationality: Argentina
- Born: 18 November 1973 (age 52) Buenos Aires, Argentina
- Height: 1.79 m (5 ft 10 in)

Career
- Sport: Golf
- Turned professional: 1998
- Former tours: Challenge Tour; Tour de las Américas
- Professional wins: 8

Number of wins by tour
- Challenge Tour: 2
- Other: 6

Best results in major championships
- Masters Tournament: DNP
- PGA Championship: DNP
- U.S. Open: CUT: 2007
- The Open Championship: DNP

Achievements and awards
- Tour de las Américas Order of Merit winner: 2007

Miguel Ángel Rodríguez (born 18 November 1973) is an Argentine professional golfer.

== Career ==
Rodriguez was born in Buenos Aires. He turned professional in 1998 and has played predominantly in South America on the Tour de las Américas and the Argentine TPG Tour. He played on Europe's second tier Challenge Tour between 2005 and 2009, winning two tournaments.

== Professional wins (8) ==
=== Challenge Tour wins (2) ===
No.	Date	Tournament	Winning score	Margin of victory	Runner(s)-up
1	11 Feb 2007	Kai Fieberg Costa Rica Open^{1}	−9 (70-67-66-72=275)	1 stroke	(Argentina) Juan Abbate, (Argentina) Gustavo Acosta
2	2 Dec 2007 (2008 season)	Abierto del Litoral Personal^{1,2}	−9 (68-66-68-69=271)	1 stroke	(Argentina) Andrés Romero

^{1}Co-sanctioned by the Tour de las Américas
^{2}Co-sanctioned by the TPG Tour

=== Tour de las Américas wins (3) ===
No.	Date	Tournament	Winning score	Margin of victory	Runner(s)-up
1	8 Mar 2005	Siemens Venezuela Open	−11 (63-64-71-71=269)	2 strokes	(Colombia) Jesús Amaya
2	11 Feb 2007	Kai Fieberg Costa Rica Open^{1}	−9 (70-67-66-72=275)	1 stroke	(Argentina) Juan Abbate, (Argentina) Gustavo Acosta
3	2 Dec 2007	Abierto del Litoral Personal^{1,2}	−9 (68-66-68-69=271)	1 stroke	(Argentina) Andrés Romero

^{1}Co-sanctioned by the Challenge Tour
^{2}Co-sanctioned by the TPG Tour

=== TPG Tour wins (5) ===
No.	Date	Tournament	Winning score	Margin of victory	Runner-up
1	25 Feb 2007	Abierto de Pinamar	−16 (67-71-61-73=272)	1 stroke	(Argentina) Julio Zapata
2	2 Dec 2007	Abierto del Litoral Personal^{1}	−9 (68-66-68-69=271)	1 stroke	(Argentina) Andrés Romero
3	1 Oct 2011	Abierto del Norte	−16 (67-67-65-65=264)	2 strokes	(Argentina) César Costilla
4	26 Oct 2012	Tupungato Winelands Match Play	1 up		(Argentina) Leandro Marelli
5	13 Dec 2015	Gran Premio Memorial Guillermo Daniel Ibañez	−10 (70-76-67-65=278)	Playoff	(Argentina) Tomas Argonz (a)

^{1}Co-sanctioned by the Challenge Tour and the Tour de las Américas

=== Other wins (1) ===
- 2005 Salta Open (Argentina)

== Results in major championships ==
Tournament	2007
U.S. Open	CUT

CUT = missed the half-way cut
Note: Rodríguez only played in the U.S. Open.
