= Rafael Alarcón (golfer) =

Mexican professional golfer (born 1958)

Personal information
- Full name: Rafael Alarcón Menchaca
- Nationality: Mexico
- Born: 5 August 1958 (age 68) Guadalajara, Mexico
- Children: 3

Career
- Sport: Golf
- College: Oklahoma State University
- Turned professional: 1980
- Former tours: PGA Tour; European Tour; Nike Tour; Canadian Tour; Tour de las Américas
- Professional wins: 3

Best results in major championships
- Masters Tournament: DNP
- PGA Championship: DNP
- U.S. Open: T52: 1985
- The Open Championship: DNP

Rafael Alarcón (born 5 August 1958) is a Mexican professional golfer who played on the PGA Tour.

== Early life ==
Alarcón was born and raised in Guadalajara, Jalisco, Mexico, playing golf from young age at Guadalajara Country Club, one of the oldest golf clubs in Mexico.

== Amateur career ==
Alarcón played on two NCAA Division I Championship winning teams, 1976 and 1978, and was a three-time All-American while attending Oklahoma State University. In 1976, he lost in a playoff to Jim Nelford at the Canadian Amateur Championship. In 1977, he was runner-up at the Western Amateur, losing in the final. Three years after his playoff loss at the Canadian Amateur, he won the championship at Brantford Golf Club, Ontario, and another important amateur tournament in North America, the Southern Amateur at the Country Club of North Carolina, Pinehurst.

Alarcón represented Mexico three times in the Eisenhower Trophy, the first time in 1974 at age 16. In 1980, at Pinehurst Country Club, North Carolina, the Mexican team finished 9th.

== Professional career ==
Alarcón turned professional after the 1980 amateur season and played in North and South America, Europe and Asia. In 1981, he finished runner-up to Tim Simpson at the unofficial European Tour approved event Cacharel World Under-25 Championship in Nimes, France.

His first professional win abroad came in 1984 at the Indian Open on the Asia Golf Circuit.

Alarcón qualified for the 1983 PGA Tour season. Alarcón never won on the PGA Tour, to match Cesar Sanudo and Victor Regalado, who, at the time of Alarcon's active career, were the only native Mexican golfers to have done so. Alarcón's best finish was tied 19th at the 1997 Kemper Open.

Two years in a row, 1995 and 1996, Alarcón finished runner-up in a tournament on the second-tier Nike Tour, namely the Nike Monterrey Open, played in his home country of Mexico. In 1995, winner Stuart Appleby needed seven extra playoff holes to beat Alarcón.

Alarcón won the 1990 Mexican PGA Championship and led the Mexican PGA Tour in earnings 1989−1992.

Alarcón represented Mexico seven times in the World Cup and twice in the Dunhill Cup. In the 1995 World Cup of Golf at Mission Hills Golf Club in Shenzhen, China, the Mexico team of Alarcón and Esteban Toledo finished tied 10th, eight strokes from second place.

On 1 December 1997, Alarcón won the Compaq World Putting Championship by Dave Pelz at the Bonnett Creek Golf Club at Walt Disney World in Orlando, Florida. He beat Spike McRoy on the second sudden-death playoff hole, winning a first prize of $250,000. Second prize was $50,000.

At 43 years of age, in 2001, Alarcon won the Venezuela Open on the Tour de las Américas.

After mainly retiring from competition play in 1997, Alarcón made a few tournament appearances in Latin America and worked as a coach for Lorena Ochoa. When Ochoa, also a Guadalajara native, was 11 years old, she approached Alarcón and asked him to coach her. During his time as her coach, she won 27 LPGA Tour titles, including two majors and reached number one on the Women's World Golf Rankings, before she retired at 28 years of age. After her retirement, he has been coaching at Lorena Ochoa's Golf Academy.

Alarcón also worked as a golf course designer, together with Carter Morrish at Alarcon Morrish Golf Course Design.

== Awards and honors ==
Alarcón was appointed Jalisco State Golfer of the Century. He was awarded the National Prize for Sports, received on 20 November 2009 from the President of Mexico during a ceremony at the official presidential residence.

== Amateur wins ==
- 1976 Mexican Junior
- 1977 Mexican Amateur
- 1978 Mexican Amateur
- 1979 Canadian Amateur Championship, Southern Amateur
- 1980 Big Eight Individual

== Professional wins (3) ==
=== Asia Golf Circuit wins (1) ===
No.	Date	Tournament	Winning score	Margin of victory	Runners-up
1	18 Mar 1984	Indian Open	−13 (70-68-71-70=279)	3 strokes	(United States) Richard Cromwell, (Taiwan) Lai Chung-jen

Asia Golf Circuit playoff record (0–1)

No.	Year	Tournament	Opponents	Result
1	1985	Taiwan Open	(Taiwan) Lu Liang-Huan, (Taiwan) Hsieh Yu-shu	Lu won with par on sixth extra hole Hsieh eliminated by par on first hole

=== Tour de las Américas wins (1) ===
No.	Date	Tournament	Winning score	Margin of victory	Runner-up
1	18 Nov 2001	Movilnet Venezuela Open	−12 (71-68-66-63=268)	1 stroke	(Brazil) Alexandre Rocha

=== Other wins (1) ===
- 1990 Mexican PGA Championship

== Playoff record ==
Nike Tour playoff record (0–1)

No.	Year	Tournament	Opponent	Result
1	1995	Nike Monterrey Open	(Australia) Stuart Appleby	Lost to birdie on seventh extra hole

== Results in major championships ==
Tournament	1984	1985	1986	1987	1988	1989	1990	1991	1992	1993	1994	1995
U.S. Open	T62	T52	CUT									CUT

Did not play

CUT = missed the half-way cut
"T" = tied
Note: Alarcón only played in the U.S. Open.

== Team appearances ==
Amateur

- Eisenhower Trophy (representing Mexico): 1974, 1976, 1980

Professional

- World Cup (representing Mexico): 1988, 1991, 1994, 1995, 1996, 1997, 1999
- Dunhill Cup (representing Mexico): 1990, 1993

== See also ==
- 1982 PGA Tour Qualifying School graduates
- 1996 PGA Tour Qualifying School graduates
