= Marco Ruiz (golfer) =

Paraguayan professional golfer (born 1974)

Personal information
- Nationality: Paraguay
- Born: 2 December 1974 (age 51) Asunción, Paraguay
- Height: 6 ft 0 in (1.83 m)

Career
- Sport: Golf
- Turned professional: 1992
- Former tours: European Tour; Challenge Tour; PGA Tour Latinoamérica; Tour de las Américas
- Professional wins: 8

Number of wins by tour
- Challenge Tour: 1
- Other: 7

Best results in major championships
- Masters Tournament: DNP
- PGA Championship: DNP
- U.S. Open: DNP
- The Open Championship: T34: 2003

Achievements and awards
- Tour de las Américas Order of Merit winner: 2012

Marco Ruiz (born 2 December 1974) is a Paraguayan professional golfer.

== Early life ==
In 1974, Ruiz was born in Asunción. He is the godson of celebrated Argentine golfer Vicente Fernández.

== Professional career ==
In 1992, Ruiz turned professional. Having played regularly on the Challenge Tour in 2005, Ruiz was successful enough to graduate directly to the full European Tour for 2006. However indifferent performances meant that he dropped down the Challenge Tour again in 2007. After finishing 21st on the money list for the 2008 season, missing out by one place on gaining exemption on the European Tour, Ruiz earned his card for 2009 with a 22nd-place finish at the qualifying school.

Ruiz has played in The Open Championship twice, in 2003 and 2006. All his career victories have been in South America, highlighted by the 2007 Argentine Open. He has also finished second in several tournaments, including the Costa Rica Open in 2002, the Guatemala Open in 2004, the Panama Open in 2004 and 2005, the Peugeot Challenge (Spain) in 2005.

== Amateur wins ==
- 1989 Paraguay Junior Championship
- 1990 Paraguay Junior Championship, Argentine Junior Championship
- 1991 Amateur Argentine Open, Paraguay Junior Championship, Argentine Junior Championship

== Professional wins (8) ==
=== Challenge Tour wins (1) ===
| No. | Date | Tournament | Winning score | Margin of victory | Runner-up |
|---|---|---|---|---|---|
| 1 | 9 Dec 2007 (2008 season) | Abierto Visa de la República^{1} | −5 (71-69-66-69=275) | 2 strokes | (Argentina) Daniel Vancsik |

^{1}Co-sanctioned by the Tour de las Américas and the TPG Tour

=== Tour de las Américas wins (4) ===
| No. | Date | Tournament | Winning score | Margin of victory | Runner(s)-up |
|---|---|---|---|---|---|
| 1 | 25 Nov 2001 | Abierto del Litoral | −6 (71-72-69-66=278) | Playoff | (Argentina) Gustavo Acosta, (Argentina) Ariel Cañete, (Argentina) Rafael Gómez, (Argentina) Rodolfo González |
| 2 | 9 Dec 2007 | Abierto Visa de la República^{1} | −5 (71-69-66-69=275) | 2 strokes | (Argentina) Daniel Vancsik |
| 3 | 27 May 2012 | Televisa TLA Players Championship | −17 (65-64-64=193) | Playoff | (Mexico) Mauricio Azcué |
| 4 | 3 Jun 2012 | Taca Airlines Open | −16 (66-67-69-70=272) | 4 strokes | (Colombia) Diego Vanegas |

^{1}Co-sanctioned by the Challenge Tour and the TPG Tour

=== TPG Tour wins (2) ===
| No. | Date | Tournament | Winning score | Margin of victory | Runner-up |
|---|---|---|---|---|---|
| 1 | 19 Aug 2007 | Carlos Franco Invitational | −9 (67-64-73-75=279) | 2 strokes | (Paraguay) Ángel Franco |
| 2 | 9 Dec 2007 | Abierto Visa de la República^{1} | −5 (71-69-66-69=275) | 2 strokes | (Argentina) Daniel Vancsik |

^{1}Co-sanctioned by the Challenge Tour and the Tour de las Américas

=== Other wins (3) ===
- 1999 Venezuela PGA Championship
- 2007 Prince of Wales Open (Chile)
- 2010 Brazil Open

== Results in major championships ==
| Tournament | 2003 | 2004 | 2005 | 2006 |
|---|---|---|---|---|
| The Open Championship | T34 | | | T63 |

Note: Ruiz only played in The Open Championship.

Did not play

"T" = tied

== Team appearances ==
- World Cup (representing Paraguay): 1995, 2003, 2005

== See also ==
- 2005 Challenge Tour graduates
- 2008 European Tour Qualifying School graduates
- 2009 European Tour Qualifying School graduates
