= 1999 Alfred Dunhill Cup =

Coordinates: 56.351484°N 2.816147°W

Tournament information
- Dates: 7–10 October
- Location: St Andrews, Scotland
- Course: Old Course at St Andrews
- Format: Match play

Statistics
- Par: 72
- Length: 7,094 yards (6,487 m)
- Field: 16 teams of 3 players
- Prize fund: £1,000,000
- Winner's share: £300,000

Champion
- Spain (S. García, M. Á. Jiménez, J. M. Olazábal)

The 1999 Alfred Dunhill Cup was the 15th Alfred Dunhill Cup. It was a team tournament featuring 16 countries, each represented by three players. The Cup was played 7–10 October at the Old Course at St Andrews in Scotland. The sponsor was the Alfred Dunhill company. The Spanish team of Sergio García, Miguel Ángel Jiménez, and José María Olazábal beat the Australian team of Stephen Leaney, Peter O'Malley, and Craig Parry in the final.

== Format ==
The Cup was a match play event played over four days. The teams were divided into four four-team groups. The top eight teams were seeded with the remaining teams randomly placed in the bracket. After three rounds of round-robin play, the top team in each group advanced to a single elimination playoff.

In each team match, the three players were paired with their opponents and played 18 holes at medal match play. Matches tied at the end of 18 holes were extended to a sudden-death playoff, unless they could not affect the outcome of the tournament (third round). The tie-breaker for ties within a group was based on match record, then head-to-head.

== Group play ==
=== Round one ===
Group 1

United States – 2		New Zealand – 1	
Player	Score	Player	Score
Mark O'Meara	73	Greg Turner	74
Payne Stewart	76	Michael Long	72
Tom Lehman	71	Michael Campbell	74

Sweden – 3		Italy – 0	
Player	Score	Player	Score
Gabriel Hjertstedt	71	Costantino Rocca	75
Jarmo Sandelin	72	Massimo Scarpa	79
Patrik Sjöland	68	Emanuele Canonica	74

Group 2

Australia – 2		Japan – 1	
Player	Score	Player	Score
Craig Parry	69	Tsuyoshi Yoneyama	70
Peter O'Malley	74	Isao Aoki	72
Stephen Leaney	69	Katsuyoshi Tomori	70

Scotland – 2		Paraguay – 1	
Player	Score	Player	Score
Sam Torrance	75	Raúl Fretes	77
Gary Orr	73	Carlos Franco	65
Paul Lawrie	71	Ángel Franco	73

Group 3

South Africa – 2		China – 1	
Player	Score	Player	Score
Ernie Els	72	Zhang Lian-wei	74
Retief Goosen	69	Cheng Jun	72
David Frost	73	Wu Xiang-bing	72

England – 2		India – 1	
Player	Score	Player	Score
Lee Westwood	73	Jeev Milkha Singh	70
Mark James	72	Jyoti Randhawa	73
David Howell	71	Vijay Kumar	72

Group 4

Ireland – 3		Zimbabwe – 0	
Player	Score	Player	Score
Paul McGinley	70	Tony Johnstone	75
Darren Clarke	69	Mark McNulty	74
Pádraig Harrington	71	Nick Price	72

Spain – 2		France – 1	
Player	Score	Player	Score
José María Olazábal	74	Jean van de Velde	74
Sergio García	67	Jean-François Remésy	70
Miguel Ángel Jiménez	73	Marc Farry	68

Olazábal won on the first playoff hole.

=== Round two ===
Group 1

United States – 0		Italy – 3	
Player	Score	Player	Score
Mark O'Meara	72	Costantino Rocca	70
Tom Lehman	74	Emanuele Canonica	72
Payne Stewart	72	Massimo Scarpa	71

Sweden – 1		New Zealand – 2	
Player	Score	Player	Score
Gabriel Hjertstedt	72	Michael Campbell	71
Patrik Sjöland	74	Michael Long	73
Jarmo Sandelin	69	Greg Turner	70

Group 2

Australia – 1		Paraguay – 2	
Player	Score	Player	Score
Peter O'Malley	73	Raúl Fretes	76
Stephen Leaney	74	Ángel Franco	73
Craig Parry	70	Carlos Franco	70

Franco won on the second playoff hole.

Scotland – 1		Japan – 2	
Player	Score	Player	Score
Sam Torrance	76	Isao Aoki	71
Gary Orr	69	Tsuyoshi Yoneyama	71
Paul Lawrie	71	Katsuyoshi Tomori	71

Tomori won on the first playoff hole.

Group 3

South Africa – 3		India – 0	
Player	Score	Player	Score
Ernie Els	69	Jeev Milkha Singh	72
Retief Goosen	67	Vijay Kumar	75
David Frost	68	Jyoti Randhawa	74

England – 2		China – 1	
Player	Score	Player	Score
Lee Westwood	69	Zhang Lian-wei	72
David Howell	75	Cheng Jun	70
Mark James	72	Wu Xiang-bing	74

Group 4

Spain – 2		Zimbabwe – 1	
Player	Score	Player	Score
Sergio García	67	Nick Price	70
José María Olazábal	67	Tony Johnstone	73
Miguel Ángel Jiménez	73	Mark McNulty	68

Ireland – 2		France – 1	
Player	Score	Player	Score
Darren Clarke	67	Marc Farry	75
Paul McGinley	74	Jean van de Velde	70
Pádraig Harrington	73	Jean-François Remésy	74

=== Round three ===
Group 1

New Zealand – 2		Italy – 1	
Player	Score	Player	Score
Greg Turner	70	Emanuele Canonica	72
Michael Long	72	Massimo Scarpa	71
Michael Campbell	70	Costantino Rocca	74

United States – 1		Sweden – 2	
Player	Score	Player	Score
Mark O'Meara	69	Patrik Sjöland	73
Payne Stewart	74	Gabriel Hjertstedt	69
Tom Lehman	74	Jarmo Sandelin	71

Group 2

Japan – 2		Paraguay – 1	
Player	Score	Player	Score
Katsuyoshi Tomori	68	Ángel Franco	72
Tsuyoshi Yoneyama	68	Raúl Fretes	69
Isao Aoki	77	Carlos Franco	65

Scotland – 1		Australia – 2	
Player	Score	Player	Score
Paul Lawrie	71	Peter O'Malley	73
Sam Torrance	71	Craig Parry	70
Gary Orr	70	Stephen Leaney	67

Group 3

South Africa – 3		England – 0	
Player	Score	Player	Score
Ernie Els	67	David Howell	69
David Frost	71	Mark James	72
Retief Goosen	66	Lee Westwood	70

India – 3		China – 0	
Player	Score	Player	Score
Jyoti Randhawa	73	Zhang Lian-wei	74
Jeev Milkha Singh	72	Cheng Jun	74
Vijay Kumar	73	Wu Xiang-bing	77

Group 4

Zimbabwe – 2.5		France – 0.5	
Player	Score	Player	Score
Mark McNulty	69	Marc Farry	73
Tony Johnstone	68	Jean-François Remésy	68
Nick Price	68	Jean van de Velde	68

Price won on the third playoff hole.

Spain – 2		Ireland – 1	
Player	Score	Player	Score
Sergio García	67	Darren Clarke	68
José María Olazábal	70	Paul McGinley	68
Miguel Ángel Jiménez	69	Pádraig Harrington	69

Jiménez won on the first playoff hole.

=== Standings ===
Group 1
Country	W	L	MW	ML
Sweden	2	1	6	3
New Zealand	2	1	5	4
Italy	1	2	4	5
United States	1	2	3	6

Group 2
Country	W	L	MW	ML
Australia	2	1	5	4
Japan	2	1	5	4
Paraguay	1	2	4	5
Scotland	1	2	4	5

Group 3
Country	W	L	MW	ML
South Africa	3	0	8	1
England	2	1	4	5
India	1	2	4	5
China	0	3	2	7

Group 4
Country	W	L	MW	ML
Spain	3	0	6	3
Ireland	2	1	6	3
Zimbabwe	1	2	3.5	5.5
France	0	3	2.5	6.5

== Playoffs ==
=== Bracket ===
Semi-finals
2	Spain	2
3	South Africa	1
5	Australia	2
8	Sweden	1

Final
2	Spain	2
5	Australia	1

=== Semi-finals ===
Spain – 2		South Africa – 1	
Player	Score	Player	Score
Sergio García	72	Ernie Els	70
Miguel Ángel Jiménez	73	David Frost	77
José María Olazábal	75	Retief Goosen	76

Australia – 2		Sweden – 1	
Player	Score	Player	Score
Craig Parry	69	Gabriel Hjertstedt	69
Peter O'Malley	78	Patrik Sjöland	76
Stephen Leaney	80	Jarmo Sandelin	80

Parry won on the first playoff hole.
Leaney won on the first playoff hole.

=== Final ===
Spain – 2		Australia – 1	
Player	Score	Player	Score
Sergio García	69	Craig Parry	69
José María Olazábal	72	Stephen Leaney	78
Miguel Ángel Jiménez	73	Peter O'Malley	75

Parry won on the first playoff hole.

== Team results ==
Country	Place	W	L	MW	ML	Seed
Spain	1	5	0	10	5	2
Australia	2	3	2	8	7	5
South Africa	T3	3	1	9	3	3
Sweden	T3	2	2	7	5	8
Ireland	T5	2	1	6	3	7
Japan	T5	2	1	5	4	
New Zealand	T5	2	1	5	4	
England	T5	2	1	4	5	6
India	T9	1	2	4	5	
Italy	T9	1	2	4	5	
Paraguay	T9	1	2	4	5	
Scotland	T9	1	2	4	5	4
Zimbabwe	T9	1	2	3.5	5.5	
United States	T9	1	2	3	6	1
France	T15	0	3	2.5	6.5	
China	T15	0	3	2	7	

== Player results ==
Country	Player	W	L
Spain	José María Olazábal	4	1
Spain	Sergio García	3	2
Spain	Miguel Ángel Jiménez	3	2
Australia	Craig Parry	4	1
Australia	Stephen Leaney	3	2
Australia	Peter O'Malley	1	4
South Africa	Ernie Els	4	0
South Africa	Retief Goosen	3	1
South Africa	David Frost	2	2
Sweden	Jarmo Sandelin	3	1
Sweden	Gabriel Hjertstedt	2	2
Sweden	Patrik Sjöland	2	2
Ireland	Darren Clarke	2	1
Ireland	Pádraig Harrington	2	1
Ireland	Paul McGinley	2	1
Japan	Isao Aoki	2	1
Japan	Katsuyoshi Tomori	2	1
Japan	Tsuyoshi Yoneyama	1	2
New Zealand	Michael Campbell	2	1
New Zealand	Michael Long	2	1
New Zealand	Greg Turner	1	2
England	Mark James	2	1
England	David Howell	1	2
England	Lee Westwood	1	2
India	Jeev Milkha Singh	2	1
India	Vijay Kumar	1	2
India	Jyoti Randhawa	1	2
Italy	Massimo Scarpa	2	1
Italy	Emanuele Canonica	1	2
Italy	Costantino Rocca	1	2
Paraguay	Carlos Franco	3	0
Paraguay	Ángel Franco	1	2
Paraguay	Raúl Fretes	0	3
Scotland	Paul Lawrie	2	1
Scotland	Gary Orr	1	2
Scotland	Sam Torrance	1	2
Zimbabwe	Mark McNulty	2	1
Zimbabwe	Nick Price	1	2
Zimbabwe	Tony Johnstone	0.5	2.5
United States	Mark O'Meara	2	1
United States	Tom Lehman	1	2
United States	Payne Stewart	0	3
France	Marc Farry	1	2
France	Jean van de Velde	1	2
France	Jean-François Remésy	0.5	2.5
China	Cheng Jun	1	2
China	Wu Xiang-bing	1	2
China	Zhang Lian-wei	0	3
