= 2005 Challenge Tour =

Golf tour season

2005 Challenge Tour season
- Duration: 25 November 2004 – 22 October 2005
- Number of official events: 30
- Most wins: (Argentina) Rafael Gómez (2) (United States) Brad Sutterfield (2) (Scotland) Marc Warren (2) (Sweden) Fredrik Widmark (2)
- Rankings: (Scotland) Marc Warren

The 2005 Challenge Tour was the 17th season of the Challenge Tour, the official development tour to the European Tour.

== Schedule ==
The following table lists official events during the 2005 season.

Date	Tournament	Host country	Purse (€)	Winner (Note: The number in brackets after each winner's name is the number of Challenge Tour events they had won up to and including that tournament. This information is only shown for Challenge Tour members. It is rare for someone to accumulate many wins on the Challenge Tour as success at this level usually leads to promotion to the European Tour.)	OWGR points	Other tours (Note: EUR − European Tour; TLA − Tour de las Américas.)	Notes
28 Nov	Abierto Mexicano de Golf	Mexico	US$300,000	(Argentina) Rafael Gómez (1)	6	TLA	New to Challenge Tour
5 Dec	Panasonic Panama Open	Panama	US$200,000	(England) Richard McEvoy (1)	6	TLA	New to Challenge Tour
12 Dec	TIM Peru Open	Peru	US$168,000	(United States) Brad Sutterfield (1)	6	TLA	New to Challenge Tour
13 Feb	American Express Costa Rica Open	Costa Rica	US$125,000	(United States) Kyle Dobbs (1)	6	TLA	
20 Feb	Summit Panama Masters	Panama	US$125,000	(United States) Kevin Haefner (1)	6	TLA	
27 Feb	Abierto Telefónica Moviles de Guatemala	Guatemala	US$125,000	(Argentina) César Monasterio (1)	6	TLA	
21 Mar	Tusker Kenya Open	Kenya	160,000	(Argentina) Daniel Vancsik (3)	6		
10 Apr	Madeira Island Open Caixa Geral de Depositos	Portugal	600,000	(Netherlands) Robert-Jan Derksen (1)	16	EUR	
1 May	Peugeot Challenge R.C.G. El Prat	Spain	115,000	(Spain) Tomás Jesús Muñoz (1)	6		
8 May	Firstplus Wales Challenge	Wales	125,000	(France) Olivier David (1)	6		
15 May	Tessali-Metaponto Open di Puglia e Basilicata	Italy	120,000	(Argentina) Rafael Gómez (2)	6		
29 May	Riu Tikida Hotels Moroccan Classic	Morocco	130,000	(Sweden) Fredrik Widmark (2)	6		
12 Jun	Thomas Bjørn Open	Denmark	115,000	(Finland) Toni Karjalainen (1)	6		New tournament
19 Jun	Aa St Omer Open	France	400,000	(Sweden) Joakim Bäckström (n/a)	16	EUR	
26 Jun	Galeria Kaufhof Pokal Challenge	Germany	115,000	(England) Gareth Davies (2)	6		
3 Jul	Open Mahou de Madrid	Spain	120,000	(England) Benn Barham (2)	6		New tournament
10 Jul	Open des Volcans – Challenge de France	France	120,000	(France) Ilya Goroneskoul (1)	6		
16 Jul	Texbond Open	Italy	115,000	(Sweden) Fredrik Widmark (3)	6		
31 Jul	Ireland Ryder Cup Challenge	Ireland	130,000	(Scotland) Marc Warren (1)	6		New tournament
14 Aug	Cadillac Russian Open	Russia	US$500,000	(Sweden) Mikael Lundberg (2)	16	EUR	
21 Aug	Rolex Trophy	Switzerland	165,000	(Scotland) Marc Warren (2)	6		
21 Aug	Skandia PGA Open	Sweden	SKr 1,000,000	(Scotland) David Patrick (1)	6		
27 Aug	Morson International Pro-Am Challenge	England	150,000	(Argentina) Andrés Romero (1)	6		
4 Sep	BA-CA Golf Open	Austria	150,000	(Northern Ireland) Michael Hoey (1)	6		
11 Sep	Telia Challenge Waxholm	Sweden	SKr 1,000,000	(Norway) Morten Hagen (1)	6		
18 Sep	Rotterdam International Open	Netherlands	115,000	(Sweden) Per G. Nyman (2)	6		New tournament
25 Sep	Kazakhstan Open	Kazakhstan	250,000	(Republic of Ireland) Stephen Browne (2)	6		New tournament
2 Oct	Open de Toulouse	France	115,000	(United States) Brad Sutterfield (2)	6		
9 Oct	Abama Open de Canarias	Spain	450,000	(England) John Bickerton (2)	16	EUR	New tournament
22 Oct	Apulia San Domenico Grand Final	Italy	250,000	(Spain) Carl Suneson (5)	6		Tour Championship

== Rankings ==
The rankings were based on prize money won during the season, calculated in Euros. The top 20 players on the rankings earned status to play on the 2006 European Tour.

Rank	Player	Prize money (€)
1	(Scotland) Marc Warren	103,577
2	(Spain) Carl Suneson	103,129
3	(Sweden) Fredrik Widmark	99,750
4	(England) Andrew Butterfield	94,335
5	(South Africa) Michael Kirk	90,620
