= Doc Salbe PGA European Challenge =

Tournament information
- Location: Bad Waldsee, Germany
- Established: 2007
- Courses: Golf & Vital Park Bad Waldsee
- Par: 72
- Length: 7,066 yards (6,461 m)
- Tour: Challenge Tour
- Format: Stroke play
- Prize fund: €140,000
- Month played: October
- Final year: 2007

Tournament record score
- Aggregate: 266 Peter Whiteford (2007)
- To par: −22 as above

Final champion
- (Scotland) Peter Whiteford
- Location in Germany Location in Baden-Württemberg

The Doc Salbe PGA European Challenge was a golf tournament on the Challenge Tour. It was only held once, in 2007, and played over the New Course at the Golf & Vitalpark Bad Waldsee in Bad Waldsee, Upper Swabia, Germany. The event was won by Scotland's Peter Whiteford.

== Winners ==
Year	Winner	Score	To par	Margin of victory	Runner-up
2007	(Scotland) Peter Whiteford	266	−22	4 strokes	(Scotland) Richie Ramsay
