= César Monasterio (golfer) =

Argentine professional golfer (born 1963)

Personal information
- Full name: César Omar Monasterio
- Nationality: Argentina
- Born: 28 November 1963 (age 62) Tucumán, Argentina
- Height: 1.77 m (5 ft 10 in)
- Weight: 78 kg (172 lb; 12.3 st)

Career
- Sport: Golf
- Turned professional: 1990
- Current tour: European Senior Tour
- Former tours: European Tour; Challenge Tour; Tour de las Américas; TPG Tour; Champions Tour
- Professional wins: 12

Number of wins by tour
- European Tour: 1
- Challenge Tour: 2
- European Senior Tour: 1
- Other: 10

Achievements and awards
- European Senior Tour Rookie of the Year: 2014

César Omar Monasterio (born 28 November 1963) is an Argentine professional golfer.

== Career ==
Monasterio was born on 28 November 1963, in Tucumán. He turned professional in 1990.

Since 2003, Monasterio has played extensively in Europe on the European Tour and its development tour, the Challenge Tour. He won the 2005 Abierto Telefónica Moviles de Guatemala on the Challenge Tour, and in 2006 captured his first European Tour title at the Aa St Omer Open, which was an official money event on both tours.

== Professional wins (12) ==
=== European Tour wins (1) ===
No.	Date	Tournament	Winning score	Margin of victory	Runners-up
1	18 Jun 2006	Aa St Omer Open^{1}	−10 (68-68-71-67=274)	1 stroke	(South Africa) Martin Maritz, (Sweden) Henrik Nyström

^{1}Dual-ranking event with the Challenge Tour

=== Challenge Tour wins (2) ===
No.	Date	Tournament	Winning score	Margin of victory	Runner(s)-up
1	27 Feb 2005	Abierto Telefónica Moviles de Guatemala^{1}	−19 (67-67-67-68=269)	Playoff	(Republic of Ireland) David Higgins
2	18 Jun 2006	Aa St Omer Open^{2}	−10 (68-68-71-67=274)	1 stroke	(South Africa) Martin Maritz, (Sweden) Henrik Nyström

^{1}Co-sanctioned by the Tour de las Américas
^{2}Dual-ranking event with the European Tour

Challenge Tour playoff record (1–1)

No.	Year	Tournament	Opponent	Result
1	2003	Credomatic MasterCard Costa Rica Open	(Argentina) Sebastián Fernández	Lost to par on first extra hole
2	2005	Abierto Telefónica Moviles de Guatemala	(Republic of Ireland) David Higgins	Won with par on first extra hole

=== Tour de las Américas wins (1) ===
No.	Date	Tournament	Winning score	Margin of victory	Runner-up
1	27 Feb 2005	Abierto Telefónica Moviles de Guatemala^{1}	−19 (67-67-67-68=269)	Playoff	(Republic of Ireland) David Higgins

^{1}Co-sanctioned by the Challenge Tour

=== TPG Tour wins (2) ===
No.	Date	Tournament	Winning score	Margin of victory	Runner-up
1	30 Nov 2008	Ángel Cabrera Classic	−14 (66-65-71=202)	Playoff	(Argentina) Andrés Romero
2	20 Oct 2012	Gran Premio Las Praderas	−13 (68-69-66=203)	Playoff	(Argentina) Ulises Méndez

=== Other wins (8) ===
- 1994 Abierto del Litoral (Arg)
- 1996 Palermo Grand Prix (Arg)
- 1997 Praderas Grand Prix (Arg)
- 1999 Abierto del Litoral (Arg)
- 2002 Acantilados Grand Prix (Arg), Santiago Open (Chile), Santiago del Estero Open (Arg)
- 2010 Viña del Mar Open (Chi)

=== European Senior Tour wins (1) ===
No.	Date	Tournament	Winning score	Margin of victory	Runners-up
1	24 Aug 2014	English Senior Open	−14 (69-63-70=202)	5 strokes	(England) Barry Lane, (Scotland) Andrew Oldcorn

== Team appearances ==
Professional

- World Cup (representing Argentina): 1995
