= Miguel Ángel Carballo =

Argentine professional golfer (born 1979)

Personal information
- Full name: Miguel Ángel Carballo
- Nickname: El Tati
- Nationality: Argentina
- Born: 22 March 1979 (age 47) Bahía Blanca, Argentina
- Height: 5 ft 10 in (1.78 m)
- Weight: 176 lb (80 kg; 12.6 st)

Career
- Sport: Golf
- Turned professional: 2002
- Current tours: Asian Tour; Asian Development Tour; All Thailand Golf Tour
- Former tours: PGA Tour; Web.com Tour; European Tour; Tour de las Américas; Japan Challenge Tour
- Professional wins: 7

Number of wins by tour
- Asian Tour: 1
- Korn Ferry Tour: 2
- Challenge Tour: 1
- Other: 3

Achievements and awards
- Asian Development Tour Order of Merit winner: 2018
Medal record
South American Games
Bronze medal – third place	2026 Santa Fe	Mixed team

Miguel Ángel Carballo (born 22 March 1979) is an Argentine professional golfer. Known affectionately as "El Tati", Carballo was the first Argentine to win on the Nationwide Tour. He has played on several Tours in his career, including the Web.com Tour (2007–11, 2013–14), European Tour (2006), Challenge Tour (2004–05), Tour de las Américas from (2003–04) and the Tour Argentino (2002–03). He played on the PGA Tour in 2012, 2014, 2016 and 2017.

== Career ==
Carballo made the cut in 17 of 25 starts during his rookie season on the 2007 Nationwide Tour and finished the season No. 31 on the money list, with $177,712. He won the season-opening Movistar Panama Championship in his first-ever Nationwide Tour start, earning full status on Tour through the end of the 2008 season. He gained entry into the field by being one of the top-eight players on the Tour de las Américas Order of Merit.

Carballo posted his first professional victory at the 2006 Abierto Telefonica de Guatemala, a co-sanctioned event on the Challenge Tour and the Tour de las Américas. He earned his European Tour card for the first time by staging a phenomenal comeback at the 108-hole European Tour Qualifying School in 2005, posting a birdie, hole-in-one, birdie finish on the final three holes to gain playing privileges.

By ranking 10th on the Nationwide Tour's money list in 2011, Carballo earned his PGA Tour card for 2012. He made only 13 cuts in 25 starts and failed to retain his card for 2013. He returned to the now-renamed Web.com Tour for 2013 and finished 23rd on the regular season money list to earn his 2014 PGA Tour card.

He was awarded the 2011 Olimpia de Plata by the Argentine Sports Journalists' Circle.

After struggling on the PGA Tour, Carballo played on the Asian Development Tour in 2018, where he had won the Ciputra Golfpreneur Tournament in Indonesia and led the Order of Merit to earn promotion to the Asian Tour. He also won on the 2019 Asian Development Tour, taking the Singha Laguna Phuket Open, an event co-sanctioned with the All Thailand Golf Tour. In September 2019, he won his first Asian Tour event, the Bank BRI Indonesia Open.

== Professional wins (7) ==
=== Asian Tour wins (1) ===
No.	Date	Tournament	Winning score	Margin of victory	Runner-up
1	1 Sep 2019	Bank BRI Indonesia Open	−17 (69-69-66-67=271)	3 strokes	(South Korea) Chang Yi-keun

=== Web.com Tour wins (2) ===
No.	Date	Tournament	Winning score	Margin of victory	Runner(s)-up
1	28 Jan 2007	Movistar Panama Championship	−6 (69-67-73-71=276)	2 strokes	(United States) Hunter Haas, (United States) Jim McGovern, (United States) Patrick Sheehan
2	9 Oct 2011	Children's Hospital Classic	−24 (69-66-65-64=264)	2 strokes	(United States) Brice Garnett

Web.com Tour playoff record (0–2)

No.	Year	Tournament	Opponents	Result
1	2011	Soboba Golf Classic	(United States) Andres Gonzales, (United States) Ted Potter Jr.	Potter won with birdie on second extra hole Carballo eliminated by birdie on first hole
2	2015	Rex Hospital Open	(United States) Patton Kizzire, (United States) Kyle Thompson	Thompson won with birdie on second extra hole

=== Challenge Tour wins (1) ===
No.	Date	Tournament	Winning score	Margin of victory	Runner-up
1	5 Feb 2006	Abierto Movistar Guatemala Open^{1}	−15 (66-66-71-70=273)	Playoff	(Argentina) Gustavo Rojas

^{1}Co-sanctioned by the Tour de las Américas

Challenge Tour playoff record (1–0)

No.	Year	Tournament	Opponent	Result
1	2006	Abierto Movistar Guatemala Open	(Argentina) Gustavo Rojas	Won with birdie on first extra hole

=== Tour de las Américas wins (1) ===
No.	Date	Tournament	Winning score	Margin of victory	Runner-up
1	5 Feb 2006	Abierto Movistar Guatemala Open^{1}	−15 (66-66-71-70=273)	Playoff	(Argentina) Gustavo Rojas

^{1}Co-sanctioned by the Challenge Tour

=== Asian Development Tour wins (2) ===
No.	Date	Tournament	Winning score	Margin of victory	Runners-up
1	25 Aug 2018	Ciputra Golfpreneur Tournament^{1}	−16 (68-68-72-64=272)	Playoff	(Malaysia) Amir Nazrin, (Thailand) Poom Pattaropong
2	19 May 2019	Singha Laguna Phuket Open^{2}	−15 (65-68-68-64=265)	Playoff	(South Korea) Tom Kim, (Thailand) Chinnarat Phadungsil

^{1}Co-sanctioned by the PGA Tour of Indonesia
^{2}Co-sanctioned by the All Thailand Golf Tour

=== TPG Tour wins (1) ===
No.	Date	Tournament	Winning score	Margin of victory	Runners-up
1	23 Nov 2014	Abierto del Litoral	−11 (68-68-66-67=269)	1 stroke	(Argentina) Jorge Monroy, (Argentina) Julio Zapata

== See also ==
- Lowest rounds of golf
- 2005 European Tour Qualifying School graduates
- 2011 Nationwide Tour graduates
- 2013 Web.com Tour Finals graduates
- 2015 Web.com Tour Finals graduates
- 2016 Web.com Tour Finals graduates
