= Misiones Open =

The Misiones Open, or the Abierto de Misiones, is a golf tournament on the TPG Tour, the official professional golf tour in Argentina. First held in 1999, it has always been held at the Tacurú Golf Club, in Posadas, Misiones Province.

The tournament not held from 2001 to 2004, 2015 or 2016.

== Winners ==
Year	Winner	Runner-up
2018	Leandro Marelli	Francisco Ojeda
2017	César Costilla	Mauricio Molina
2016	No tournament	
2015	No tournament	
2014	César Costilla	Sergio Rohlmann
2013	César Costilla	Fermin Noste
2012	Francisco Ojeda	Sebastián Fernández
2011	Paulo Pinto	César Costilla, Sebastián Fernández
2010	Gustavo Acosta	Eduardo Argiro
2009	No tournament	
2008	Paulo Pinto	Daniel Vancsik, Juan Ojeda
2007	Sergio Acevedo	Marco Ruiz
2006	César Costilla	Emilio Dominguez
2005	Daniel Barbetti ^{PO}	Julio Zapata
2004	No tournament	
2003	No tournament	
2002	No tournament	
2001	No tournament	
2000	Raúl Fretes	Miguel Fernandez
1999	Raúl Fretes	César Monasterio, Rafael Gómez

^{PO} – won following playoff
