= Ángel Franco =

Paraguayan golfer

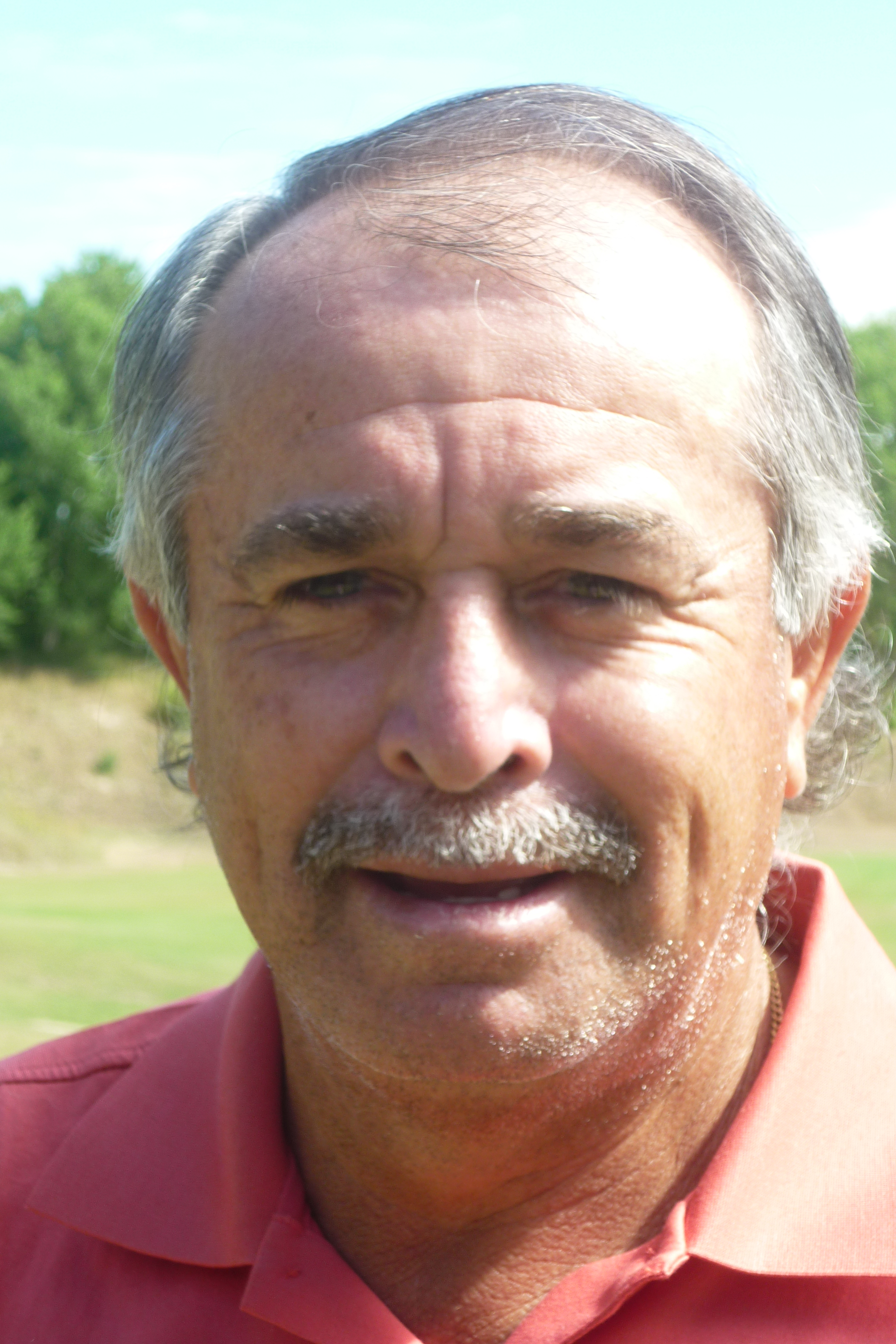

Personal information
- Nationality: Paraguay
- Born: 31 May 1958 (age 68) Asunción, Paraguay
- Height: 1.73 m (5 ft 8 in)
- Weight: 90 kg (198 lb; 14 st 2 lb)

Career
- Sport: Golf
- Turned professional: 1974
- Former tours: PGA Tour; Tour de las Américas; European Senior Tour
- Professional wins: 16

Number of wins by tour
- Korn Ferry Tour: 1
- Other: 15

Achievements and awards
- South American Tour Order of Merit: 1991

Ángel Franco (born 31 May 1958) is a Paraguayan professional golfer.

== Early life ==
In 1958, Franco was born in Asunción. His brother is the professional golfer Carlos Franco.

== Professional career ==
In 1974, Franco turned pro. He won the South American Tour Order of Merit in 1991. In 2007, he was second at the Carlos Franco Invitational, and won the same tournament in 2012 in a playoff against younger brother Ramon.

Currently, Franco is a member of European Seniors Tour, and his best finish on this tour has been second place at the 2008 Jersey Seniors Classic, 2008 Russian Seniors Open and the 2009 De Vere Collection PGA Seniors Championship.

== Professional wins (16) ==
=== Nike Tour wins (1) ===
No.	Date	Tournament	Winning score	Margin of victory	Runner-up
1	6 Jun 1993	Nike Dominion Open	−16 (68-66-67-71=272)	2 strokes	(United States) Rocky Walcher

=== Canadian Tour wins (1) ===
No.	Date	Tournament	Winning score	Margin of victory	Runners-up
1	5 Sep 1993	PEI Classic	−12 (71-69-68-68=276)	2 strokes	(Canada) Philip Jonas, (United States) Robert Meyer

=== Tour de las Américas wins (1) ===
- 2000 TPG Movilnet Classic

=== TPG Tour wins (1) ===
No.	Date	Tournament	Winning score	Margin of victory	Runner-up
1	15 Dec 2012	Carlos Franco Invitational	−3 (71-69-70=210)	Playoff	(Paraguay) Ramón Franco

=== Argentine wins (6) ===
- 1989 Jockey Club Rosario Open
- 1990 Los Lagartos Grand Prix, Praderas Grand Prix
- 1991 Rio Cuarto Open
- 1992 Center Open
- 1996 Norpatagonico Open

=== Other wins (6) ===
- 1990 Los Leones Open (Chile)
- 1991 Brazil Open, Prince of Wales Open (Chile)
- 1992 Quito Open (Ecuador)
- 1995 Marbella Open (Chile), Callaway Cup (Paraguay)

== Team appearances ==
- World Cup (representing Paraguay): 1985, 1991, 1993, 1994, 2001
- Alfred Dunhill Cup (representing Paraguay): 1991, 1993, 1994, 1999
