= Copa Tres Diamantes =

Tournament information
- Location: Barquisimeto, Venezuela
- Established: 2006
- Course: Barquisimeto CC
- Tour: Tour de las Americas
- Format: Stroke play
- Prize fund: VBF 225,000
- Month played: May

Tournament record score
- Aggregate: 274 Otto Solís (2006); 274 Paulo Pinto (2009)
- To par: -10 Otto Solís (2006)

Current champion
- (Argentina) Paulo Pinto

The Copa Tres Diamantes is a golf tournament on the Tour de las Americas, the highest level professional golf tour in Latin America. First held in 2006, it has always been held at the Barquisimeto Country Club in Barquisimeto, Venezuela.

Although it has been a fixture on the Tour de las Americas schedule since its inception, it has only been a qualifying event for the Order of Merit since 2008.

== Winners ==
Year	Winner	Score
2009	(Argentina) Paulo Pinto	274 (-6)
2008	(Argentina) Sebastián Saavedra	206 (-7)
2007	(Argentina) Sebastián Saavedra	278 (-6)
2006	(Venezuela) Otto Solís	274 (-10)
