= Rodolfo González (golfer) =

Argentine golfer

Personal information
- Nationality: Argentina
- Born: 1 February 1967 (age 59) Buenos Aires, Argentina
- Height: 1.85 m (6 ft 1 in)
- Weight: 105 kg (231 lb; 16.5 st)

Career
- Sport: Golf
- Turned professional: 1989
- Former tour: European Tour
- Professional wins: 14

Rodolfo González (born 1 February 1967) is an Argentine professional golfer.

== Career ==
González was born in Buenos Aires. He worked as a caddie in Ranelagh Golf Club, Buenos Aires, before turning professional in 1989.

González won the Argentine Tour Ranking in 1999. He competed on the Challenge Tour from 2005 to 2009 and his best finishes were third place in the Costa Rica Open in 2005, fourth in the Guatemala Open in 2007 and the Argentine Open 2008. He also competed on the European Tour in 2000 and 2006-08.

González represented Argentina on one occasion in the qualifying World Cup, in 2008.

In 2003 he won the Argentine Open.

== Professional wins (14) ==
=== Tour de las Américas wins (1) ===
| No. | Date | Tournament | Winning score | Margin of victory | Runners-up |
|---|---|---|---|---|---|
| 1 | 21 Mar 2004 | American Express Puerto Rico Open | −6 (71-72-69-70=282) | 1 stroke | (Argentina) Eduardo Argiró, (Canada) David Morland IV |

=== TPG Tour wins (1) ===
| No. | Date | Tournament | Winning score | Margin of victory | Runners-up |
|---|---|---|---|---|---|
| 1 | 1 Nov 2009 | Abierto del Sur | −9 (67-69-67-68=271) | Playoff | (Argentina) Miguel Ángel Carballo, (Argentina) Sebastián Saavedra |

=== Ángel Cabrera Tour wins (1) ===
- 2015 Fecha 2

=== Other wins (11) ===
- 1996 Buenos Aires Golf Club Grand Prix
- 1999 South Open, Norpatagonico Open
- 2000 Ranelagh Open
- 2002 Abierto del Litoral
- 2003 Argentine Open
- 2004 Norpatagonico Open
- 2005 South Open
- 2006 Norpatagonico Open, Roberto de Vicenzo Classic
- 2007 Angel Cabrera Classic Pro-Am (with Ricardo Smith)
