= TLA Players Championship =

Tournament information
- Location: Acapulco, Mexico
- Established: 2002
- Course: Fairmont Acapulco Princess
- Par: 70
- Tour: Tour de las Américas
- Format: Stroke play
- Prize fund: US$70,000
- Month played: May
- Final year: 2012

Tournament record score
- Aggregate: 189 Julián Etulain (2011); 260* Rafael Ponce (2004)
- To par: –21 Julián Etulain (2011) –21* Rafael Ponce (2004) * 72 holes prior to 2005

Current champion
- (Paraguay) Marco Ruiz

The TLA Players Championship was a men's golf tournament on the Tour de las Américas, the highest level professional golf tour in Latin America, held from 2002 to 2012. It was held at several different courses in the seaside resort of Acapulco in Mexico.

Since 2005, the tournament was played over 54 holes (3 rounds), having originally been contested over 72 holes (4 rounds).

== Winners ==
Year	Venue	Winner	Score	Runner(s)-up
2012	Fairmont Acapulco Princess	(Paraguay) Marco Ruiz	193 (–17)	(Mexico) Mauricio Azcué
2011	Fairmont Acapulco Princess	(Argentina) Julián Etulain	189 (–21)	(Argentina) Cesar Agustin Costilla
2010	Fairmont Acapulco Princess	(Argentina) Luciano Dodda	192 (–18)^{PO}	(Argentina) Julián Etulain
2009	Fairmont Pierre Marques	(Colombia) Eduardo Herrera	200 (–16)^{PO}	(Colombia) Jaime Clavijo
2008	Fairmont Acapulco Princess	(Argentina) Rafael Gómez	200 (–10)	(Venezuela) Raul Sanz
2007	No tournament			
2006	Mayan Palace	(Argentina) Julio Zapata	197 (–19)	(Argentina) Miguel Fernández, (Argentina) Fabián Gómez
2005	Fairmont Pierre Marques	(Mexico) Antonio Serna	205 (–11)	(Argentina) Miguel Rodriguez
2004	Fairmont Acapulco Princess	(Ecuador) Rafael Ponce	260 (–20)	(Argentina) Rodolfo González
2003	Fairmont Acapulco Princess	(Mexico) José Octavio González	263 (–17)	(Argentina) Miguel Fernández
2002	Fairmont Acapulco Princess	(Argentina) Roberto Cóceres	263 (–17)	(Argentina) César Monasterio
