= Argentine Masters =

Argentinean golf tournament

Tournament information
- Location: Buenos Aires, Argentina
- Established: 1961
- Course(s): Olivos Golf Club
- Par: 71
- Length: 6,740 yards
- Tour(s): Tour de las Americas; TPG Tour
- Format: Stroke play
- Prize fund: ARS400,000
- Month played: December
- Final year: 2011

Tournament record score
- Aggregate: 271 Raúl Fretes (1998); 271 Ángel Cabrera (1999); 271 Fabián Gómez (2008); 271 Andrés Romero (2010)

Current champion
- (Argentina) José Cóceres

The Argentine Masters or Torneo de Maestros was one of the most prestigious golf tournaments in Argentina, despite not having been played continuously since the inaugural event in 1961. It was always held at the Olivos Golf Club near Buenos Aires.

The tournament formed part of the Tour de las Americas schedule. In 2008 it was co-sanctioned by the Canadian Tour (2009 season).

The most successful players have been the superstars of Argentine golf, Roberto De Vicenzo with five victories, and Ángel Cabrera with four wins in the five events held between 1999 and 2007.

== Winners ==
Year	Winner	Score	Runner(s)-up
2011	(Argentina) José Cóceres	276 (−8)	(Argentina) Ricardo González
2010	(Argentina) Andrés Romero	271 (−13)	(Argentina) Fabián Gómez
2009	(United States) Tom Lehman	274 (−10)	(Argentina) Daniel Vancsik, (Argentina) Miguel Ángel Carballo
2008	(Argentina) Fabián Gómez	271 (−13)	(Argentina) Andrés Romero
2007	(Argentina) Ángel Cabrera	277 (−7)^{PO}	(Argentina) Ricardo González
2006	(Argentina) Andrés Romero	204 (−9)	(Argentina) Ángel Cabrera
2005	(Argentina) Ángel Cabrera	278 (−6)	(Argentina) Julio Zapata
2002–04	No tournament		
2001	(Argentina) Ángel Cabrera	272 (−12)	(Argentina) Eduardo Romero
2000	No tournament		
1999	(Argentina) Ángel Cabrera	271 (−13)	(United States) Scott Dunlap, (Argentina) Fabian Montovia, (Italy) Costantino Rocca
1998	(Paraguay) Raúl Fretes	271 (−13)	(Argentina) Eduardo Romero
1997	(Germany) Bernhard Langer	277 (−7)	(Argentina) Eduardo Romero
1978–96	No tournament		
1977	(Argentina) Florentino Molina	273 (−11)	(United States) Tommy Aaron, (England) Peter Townsend
1975–76	No tournament		
1974	(Argentina) Roberto De Vicenzo	277 (−7)	(Argentina) Carlos Liberto
1972–73	No tournament		
1971	(Argentina) Vicente Fernández	282 (−2)	(Argentina) Florentino Molina
1970	(Argentina) Roberto De Vicenzo	273 (−11)	(United States) Billy Casper, (South Africa) Gary Player
1969	(United States) Bert Yancey	273 (−11)	(Argentina) Orlando Tudino
1968	(United States) George Archer	276 (−8)	(United States) Bob Goalby
1967	(Argentina) Vicente Fernández	279 (−5)	(Argentina) Roberto De Vicenzo
1966	(Argentina) Roberto De Vicenzo	277 (−7)	(United States) Bob McCallister
1965	(Argentina) Leopoldo Ruiz	277 (−7)	(Argentina) Roberto De Vicenzo
1964	(Argentina) Roberto De Vicenzo	273 (−11)	(Argentina) Florentino Molina
1963	(Argentina) Leopoldo Ruiz	281 (−3)	(Argentina) Roberto De Vicenzo
1962	(Argentina) Roberto De Vicenzo	195 (−21)	(New Zealand) Bob Charles
1961	(Chile) Enrique Orellana	272 (−12)	(Argentina) Leopoldo Ruiz
