= Tour de las Américas =

Professional golf tour

- Formerly: South American Tour
- Sport: Golf
- Founded: 1991
- First season: 1991
- Folded: 2012
- Country: Based in Latin America
- Most titles: Order of Merit titles: (Paraguay) Raúl Fretes (2) (Argentina) Rafael Gómez (2)
- Related competitions: PGA Tour Latinoamérica; TPG Tour
- Website: http://www.tourdelasamericas.com

The Tour de las Américas (TLA) was the principal men's professional golf tour throughout Latin America and the Caribbean from 2000 through to 2012 when it was superseded by the PGA Tour Latinoamérica.

== History ==
Top level tournament golf in Latin America has had an unstable history. Some of the national open championships in the region are long established, but they did not traditionally form a coherent tour. From the late 1950s through to the mid 1970s the Caribbean Tour, which was affiliated with the PGA Tour, comprised only a small number of tournaments but attracted entrants from leading European and American golfers. As interest from PGA Tour players dwindled, the tour eventually withdrew their support and the Caribbean Tour folded. The next attempt was the IMG promoted South American Tour, which began in 1979 with the existing national opens of the five leading Latin American countries and a circuit prize sponsored by Pierre Cardin.

A new circuit was founded in 1991, the Tour Sudamericano, which would become the first long-lived stable tour in the region. In 2000, new owners relaunched the tour under the name Tour de las Américas with the aim of creating a schedule which would cover the whole region from Argentina to the Caribbean, and gain broader media exposure. The tour soon introduced a policy of co-sanctioning some events with Europe's second tier Challenge Tour, and some years later, in 2008, a similar arrangement was agreed with the Canadian Tour. The TLA also co-operated with the Nationwide Tour; whereby some of the leading Tour de las Américas players are given entries to specific Nationwide Tour events.

In May 2003, it was announced that the tour had signed a title sponsorship agreement with American Express, being renamed as the American Express Tour de las Américas.

In the early 21st century, Latin America was the only region of the World which still did not have a professional tour which was a full member of the International Federation of PGA Tours, the Tour de las Américas having joined the federation as an associate member on 30 July 2007. In August 2010, the Governing Board of the Official World Golf Ranking made a provisional announcement that the tour would offer ranking points starting in 2011. The first tournament to receive ranking points was 2011 Abierto de Chile.

== Order of Merit winners ==
Season	Winner	Points	Ref
2012	(Paraguay) Marco Ruiz	26,884	
2011	(Argentina) Joaquín Estévez	51,970	
2010	(Argentina) Julián Etulain	56,593	
2009	(Sweden) Peter Gustafsson	40,934	
Season	Winner	Prize money (US$)	Ref
2008	(Argentina) Estanislao Goya	58,105	
2007	(Argentina) Miguel Rodríguez	60,180	
2006	(Paraguay) Fabrizio Zanotti	68,790	
2005	(Argentina) Daniel Barbetti	41,514	
2004	(Argentina) Rafael Gómez (2)	59,220	
2003	(Argentina) Eduardo Argiró	48,174	
2001–02	(Argentina) Rafael Gómez	55,987	
2000–01	(Colombia) Ángel Romero	49,396	
1999	(United States) Scott Dunlap	95,320	
1998	(Paraguay) Raúl Fretes (2)	101,088	
1997	(Argentina) Ricardo González		
1996	(Paraguay) Pedro Martínez		
1995	(Argentina) Ángel Cabrera		
1994	(Paraguay) Raúl Fretes		
1993	(Paraguay) Carlos Franco		
1992	(United States) Eric Woods		
1991	(Paraguay) Ángel Franco		
