= 2006 Challenge Tour graduates =

This is a list of players who graduated from the Challenge Tour in 2006. The top 20 players on the Challenge Tour's money list in 2006 earned their European Tour card for 2007.

	2006 Challenge Tour		2007 European Tour				
Player	Money list rank	Earnings (€)	Starts	Cuts made	Best finish	Money list rank	Earnings (€)
(Wales) Mark Pilkington	1	119,152	33	13	T6	136	175,085
(Sweden) Johan Axgren	2	105,699	29	12	T15	170	118,696
(Sweden) Alex Norén*	3	99,631	28	13	T3	63	472,336
(Germany) Martin Kaymer*	4	93,321	29	16	T2	41	754,691
(England) James Hepworth	5	84,236	30	11	T16	164	136,173
(Wales) Kyron Sullivan*	6	83,364	30	12	T12	131	180,643
(Argentina) Rafael Echenique*	7	82,737	28	12	2	113	227,069
(Spain) Juan Parrón*	8	71,089	27	9	T13	183	81,554
(England) Sam Walker	9	69,853	31	12	T4	80	341,293
(England) Marcus Higley*	10	67,851	31	13	T2	151	151,185
(England) Shaun P. Webster	11	65,536	25	7	T18	204	53,786
(England) Gary Lockerbie*	12	64,073	30	13	T5	144	162,709
(Spain) Rafa Cabrera-Bello*	13	62,849	33	16	T18	134	178,927
(England) James Heath*	14	60,346	29	11	T4	152	150,758
(England) Gareth Davies*	15	60,189	25	9	T9	181	86,887
(England) Lee S. James	16	59,704	23	7	T10	202	56,775
(France) Jean-Baptiste Gonnet*	17	59,343	24	13	T2	90	292,379
(Spain) Álvaro Quirós*	18	57,278	13	7	Win	102	259,350
(Denmark) Mads Vibe-Hastrup	19	52,485	24	15	Win	61	482,549
(France) Adrien Mörk*	20	52,136	18	4	T46	271	12,020

* European Tour rookie in 2007
T = Tied
The player retained his European Tour card for 2008 (finished inside the top 117).
The player did not retain his European Tour Tour card for 2008, but retained conditional status (finished between 118-149).
The player did not retain his European Tour card for 2008 (finished outside the top 149).

The players ranked 16th through 20th were placed below the Qualifying School graduates on the exemption list, and thus could improve their status by competing in Qualifying School. Álvaro Quirós improved his status in this way.

== Winners on the European Tour in 2007 ==
No.	Date	Player	Tournament	Winning score	Margin of victory	Runners-up
1	10 Dec 2006	(Spain) Álvaro Quirós	Alfred Dunhill Championship	−13 (74-66-68-67=275)	1 stroke	(South Africa) Charl Schwartzel
2	14 Oct	(Denmark) Mads Vibe-Hastrup	Open de Madrid Valle Romano	−16 (69-69-67-67=272)	3 strokes	(Spain) Alejandro Cañizares

== Runners-up on the European Tour in 2007 ==
No.	Date	Player	Tournament	Winner	Winning score	Runner-up score
1	18 Mar	(Argentina) Rafael Echenique	TCL Classic	(Thailand) Chapchai Nirat	−22 (61-66-68-71=266)	−19 (64-69-68-68=269)
2	17 Jun	(England) Marcus Higley	Open de Saint-Omer	(Spain) Carl Suneson	−8 (67-70-70-69=276)	−5 (67-70-71-71=279)
3–4	14 May	(France) Jean-Baptiste Gonnet	Scandinavian Masters	(Finland) Mikko Ilonen	−6 (67-72-67-68=274)	−4 (67-70-71-68=276)
3–4	14 May	(Germany) Martin Kaymer	Scandinavian Masters	(Finland) Mikko Ilonen	−6 (67-72-67-68=274)	−4 (67-68-68-73=276)

== See also ==
- 2006 European Tour Qualifying School graduates
- 2007 European Tour
