= David Drysdale =

Scottish golfer (born 1975)

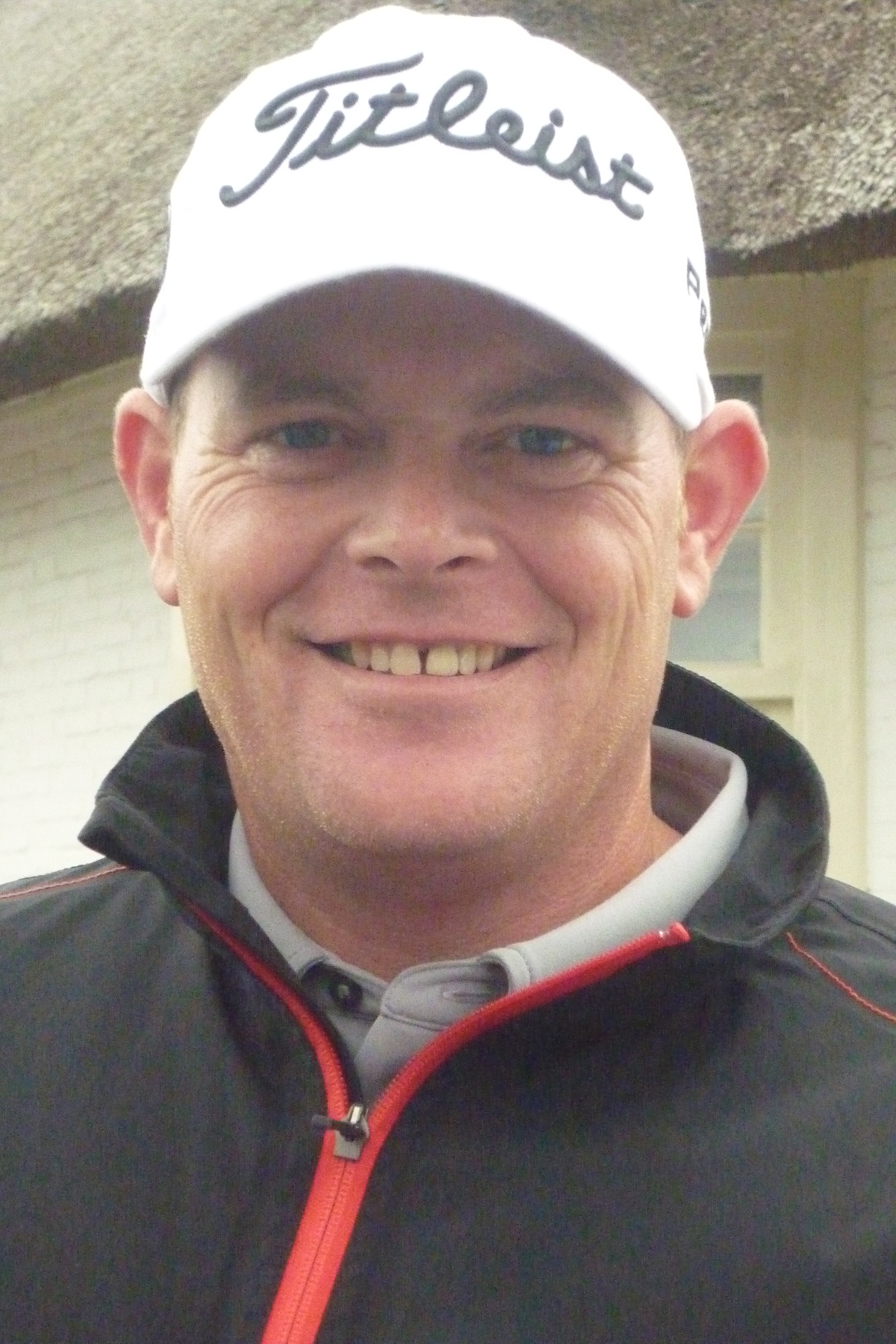

Personal information
- Full name: David Stuart Drysdale
- Nickname: Double D
- Nationality: Scotland
- Born: 19 March 1975 (age 51) Edinburgh, Scotland
- Height: 5 ft 11 in (1.80 m)
- Weight: 191 lb (87 kg; 13.6 st)
- Spouse: Victoria (m. 2004)

Career
- Sport: Golf
- Turned professional: 1995
- Current tour: European Senior Tour
- Former tours: European Tour; Asian Tour; Sunshine Tour; Challenge Tour
- Professional wins: 3

Number of wins by tour
- Challenge Tour: 2
- European Senior Tour: 1

Best results in major championships
- Masters Tournament: DNP
- PGA Championship: DNP
- U.S. Open: DNP
- The Open Championship: T27: 2017

David Stuart Drysdale (born 19 March 1975) is a Scottish professional golfer.

== Career ==
Drysdale was born in Edinburgh. He turned professional in 1995. He married his childhood sweetheart Victoria in 2004.

Drysdale currently competes on the European Tour, having graduated through qualifying school for the fourth time at the end of 2008. He had previously qualified for the elite tour in 2001, 2006 and 2007 through q-school, in addition to graduating directly from the Challenge Tour in 2004, when he finished 12th on the end of season rankings, largely thanks to a sudden death playoff victory over Mattias Eliasson at the Bouygues Telecom Grand Final.

Prior to 2009, Drysdale's best finish on the European Tour had been as runner-up at the 2006 Russian Open. In March 2009, he equalled that when he finished second in the Open de Andalucia. That result in Spain followed a third place in the Joburg Open earlier in the season, allowed Drysdale to qualify for the season ending Dubai World Championship. He finished the season inside the top 50 on the Race to Dubai, to comfortably retain his card for the 2010 season.

In October 2009, he briefly became the highest ranked Scottish golfer in the Official World Golf Ranking.

In the 2012 season on the European Tour, Drysdale's best finishes were a 3rd place in the Joburg Open, 7th at the Irish Open, and 10th at the BMW PGA Championship. He was well inside the top 60 of the European Tour Race to Dubai, finishing 48th.

The 2013 season saw Drysdale finish 6th at the Avantha Masters, and 10th at the Johnnie Walker Championship at Gleneagles. His final position on the Race to Dubai of 80th was more than good enough to retain his playing rights for the 2014 season.

In 2014, a back injury at the start of the season caused Drysdale to pull out of the Nelson Mandela Championship. He finished 8th at The Championship at Laguna National in May, his first top-10 of the season. At the ISPS Handa Perth International in October, he had to finish in the top 7 to retain his European Tour card for 2015. On the last putt on the 18th green, Drysdale holed a 30-foot putt to finish 4th place and secure his card for the following season finishing 102 on the 2014 Race to Dubai.

== Professional wins (3) ==
=== Challenge Tour wins (2) ===
Legend
Tour Championships (1)
Other Challenge Tour (1)

| No. | Date | Tournament | Winning score | Margin of victory | Runner-up |
|---|---|---|---|---|---|
| 1 | 24 Oct 2004 | Bouygues Telecom Grand Final | −13 (67-65-69-70=271) | Playoff | (Sweden) Mattias Eliasson |
| 2 | 19 Sep 2006 | Peugeot Challenge R.C.G. El Prat | −10 (68-71-71-68=278) | 2 strokes | (Sweden) Johan Axgren |

Challenge Tour playoff record (1–1)

| No. | Year | Tournament | Opponent | Result |
|---|---|---|---|---|
| 1 | 2004 | Open de Toulouse | (Zimbabwe) Marc Cayeux | Lost to par on first extra hole |
| 2 | 2004 | Bouygues Telecom Grand Final | (Sweden) Mattias Eliasson | Won with birdie on first extra hole |

=== European Senior Tour wins (1) ===
| No. | Date | Tournament | Winning score | Margin of victory | Runners-up |
|---|---|---|---|---|---|
| 1 | 23 Nov 2025 | Vattanac Legends Championship | −12 (70-68-66=204) | 1 stroke | (England) Peter Baker, (England) Anthony Wall |

== Playoff record ==
European Tour playoff record (0–1)

| No. | Year | Tournament | Opponent | Result |
|---|---|---|---|---|
| 1 | 2020 | Commercial Bank Qatar Masters | (Spain) Jorge Campillo | Lost to birdie on fifth extra hole |

== Results in major championships ==
| Tournament | 2009 | 2010 | 2011 | 2012 | 2013 | 2014 | 2015 | 2016 | 2017 |
|---|---|---|---|---|---|---|---|---|---|
| Masters Tournament | | | | | | | | | |
| U.S. Open | | | | | | | | | |
| The Open Championship | T60 | | | | | | | | T27 |
| PGA Championship | | | | | | | | | |

Did not play

CUT = missed the half-way cut
"T" = tied

== Team appearances ==
- World Cup (representing Scotland): 2009

== See also ==
- 2006 European Tour Qualifying School graduates
- 2007 European Tour Qualifying School graduates
- 2008 European Tour Qualifying School graduates
