= Kalle Brink =

Swedish professional golfer

Personal information
- Full name: Karl-Henrik Brink
- Nationality: Sweden
- Born: 12 August 1975 (age 51) Helsingborg, Sweden
- Height: 1.80 m (5 ft 11 in)
- Weight: 75 kg (165 lb; 11.8 st)

Career
- Sport: Golf
- Turned professional: 1994
- Former tours: European Tour; Challenge Tour; Swedish Golf Tour
- Professional wins: 4

Number of wins by tour
- Challenge Tour: 3
- Other: 1

Achievements and awards
- PGA of Sweden Future Fund Award: 1998

Karl-Henrik Brink (born 12 August 1975) is a Swedish professional golfer and former European Tour player. He has three Challenge Tour victories.

== Early life ==
Brink was born in Helsingborg, Sweden, and represented Vasatorp Golf Club. His sister, Maria, is also a professional golfer, who has competed on the Ladies European Tour.

== Amateur career ==
Brink had a successful amateur career and reached the semifinals of The Amateur Championship in 1994, held at Nairn Golf Club.

Representing the Swedish National Team, Brink collected medals both in European and World championships. He won the 1993 European Boys' Team Championship in Switzerland where his team, including Johan Axgren, Daniel Olsson and Johan Edfors, beat England 6–1 in the final. He also represented Sweden at the 1994 Espirito Santo Trophy at Le Golf National, near Paris, earning a bronze medal with his team mates Eric Carlberg, Freddie Jacobson and Mikael Lundberg.

== Professional career ==
Brink turned professional as a teenager in 1994. He joined the 1995 Swedish Golf Tour, and in 1997 took the step up to the Challenge Tour, Europe's second tier, where he saw immediate success.

In his rookie season, he won the inaugural Slovenian Open and was runner-up at the Siab Open and then the season's penultimate event the Estoril Challenge, a stroke behind José Manuel Carriles, to finish second in the season rankings, and graduate to the European Tour for 1998. He had the opportunity to play in events on the European Tour most years and made over 60 career starts, but only had one full season at the top level. He recorded a top-10 finish at the 2003 Russian Open.

Brink collected a total of three Challenge Tour victories over his career. His second came in 1999 at the Öhrlings Swedish Matchplay, where he beat Henrik Stenson in the final. His third win came at the 2006 Lexus Open in Norway.

== Professional wins (4) ==
=== Challenge Tour wins (3) ===
No.	Date	Tournament	Winning score	Margin of victory	Runner(s)-up
1	27 Jul 1997	BTC Slovenian Open	−21 (68-67-72-64=271)	3 strokes	(Sweden) Mikael Lundberg
2	5 Sep 1999	Öhrlings Swedish Matchplay	19 holes		(Sweden) Henrik Stenson
3	18 Jun 2006	Lexus Open	−13 (69-69-72-65=275)	3 strokes	(Spain) José Manuel Carriles, (Scotland) Greig Hutcheon, (Norway) Peter Kaensche, (Norway) Jan-Are Larsen

=== Other wins (1) ===
- 2000 Flommen Open (Swedish mini-tour)

== Team appearances ==
Amateur

- Jacques Léglise Trophy (representing the Continent of Europe): 1993
- European Boys' Team Championship (representing Sweden): 1993 (winners)
- Eisenhower Trophy (representing Sweden): 1994
- St Andrews Trophy (representing the Continent of Europe): 1994
