= 2006 Alps Tour =

Golf tour season

2006 Alps Tour season
- Duration: 15 March 2006 – 27 October 2006
- Number of official events: 21
- Most wins: (France) Jean-Nicolas Billot (3)
- Order of Merit: (France) François Calmels

The 2006 Alps Tour was the sixth season of the Alps Tour, a third-tier golf tour recognised by the European Tour.

== Schedule ==
The following table lists official events during the 2006 season.

Date	Tournament	Host country	Purse (€)	Winner (Note: The number in brackets after each winner's name is the number of Alps Tour events they had won up to and including that tournament. It is rare for someone to accumulate many wins on the Alps Tour as success at this level usually leads to promotion to the Challenge Tour.)
17 Mar	Open de Fès	Morocco	35,000	(France) Julien Forêt (1)
24 Mar	Open de Mohammedia	Morocco	35,000	(France) François Calmels (1)
1 Apr	Trophée Maroc Telecom	Morocco	35,000	(France) François Calmels (2)
7 May	Waidhofen Open	Austria	55,000	(France) Bruno-Teva Lecuona (1)
14 May	Open de Bordeaux	France	45,000	(France) Jean-Nicolas Billot (2)
19 May	Open La Margherita	Italy	35,000	(France) Jean-Nicolas Billot (3)
28 May	Gösser Open	Austria	35,000	(Austria) Jürgen Maurer (1)
4 Jun	Open Aquarelle.com Côtes d'Armor Bretagne	France	45,000	(France) Julien Xanthopoulos (1)
19 Jun	Memorial Olivier Barras	Switzerland	35,000	(Spain) Agustín Domingo (1)
23 Jun	Open Le Fronde	Italy	35,000	(France) Jean-Nicolas Billot (4)
2 Jul	Open de Neuchâtel	Switzerland	45,000	(England) Gary Marks (1)
9 Jul	Open du Haut Poitou	France	40,000	(France) Xavier Lazurowicz (1)
19 Aug	Schärding Baroque Open	Austria	35,000	(France) Fabien Marty (1)
27 Aug	Uniqa FinanceLife Styrian Open	Austria	50,000	(Italy) Andrea Maestroni (2)
10 Sep	Open de la Mirabelle d'Or	France	45,000	(France) Mike Lorenzo-Vera (2)
17 Sep	Open La Pavoniere	Italy	35,000	(France) Charles Dubois (1)
24 Sep	Open International Stade Français Paris	France	45,000	(France) Christophe Brazillier (1)
6 Oct	Cordial Resort Pelagone Open	Italy	35,000	(France) Charles-Édouard Russo (1)
15 Oct	Masters 26 Dijon-Bourgogne	France	40,000	(Austria) Ulf Wendling (1)
22 Oct	Masters 13	France	50,000	(France) Jean-François Remésy (2)
27 Oct	Open Le Madonie	Italy	50,000	(Spain) Agustín Domingo (2)

== Order of Merit ==
The Order of Merit was based on tournament results during the season, calculated using a points-based system. The top five players on the Order of Merit (not otherwise exempt) earned status to play on the 2007 Challenge Tour.

Position	Player	Points	Status earned
1	(France) François Calmels	32,818	Qualified for European Tour (Top 25 in Q School)
2	(France) Jean-Nicolas Billot	28,145	Promoted to Challenge Tour
3	(France) Christophe Brazillier	27,860	Promoted to Challenge Tour
4	(France) Mike Lorenzo-Vera	27,489	Promoted to Challenge Tour
5	(France) Julien Xanthopoulos	24,337	Promoted to Challenge Tour
6	(France) Julien Millet	21,930	Promoted to Challenge Tour
7	(France) Charles Dubois	21,126	
8	(France) Bruno-Teva Lecuona	19,953	
9	(Austria) Ulf Wendling	16,966	
10	(Austria) Roland Steiner	16,855	
