= 2008 Challenge Tour graduates =

This is a list of players who graduated from the Challenge Tour in 2008. The top 20 players on the Challenge Tour's money list in 2008 earned their European Tour card for 2009.

	2008 Challenge Tour		2009 European Tour				
Player	Money list rank	Earnings (€)	Starts	Cuts made	Best finish	Money list rank	Earnings (€)
(England) David Horsey*	1	144,118	26	19	T2	76	424,666
(England) Gary Lockerbie	2	138,509	29	18	T4	108	289,461
(Netherlands) Taco Remkes*	3	137,331	30	8	T12	195	66,178
(Northern Ireland) Gareth Maybin*	4	117,719	27	21	2	53	625,876
(Argentina) Estanislao Goya*	5	113,336	25	15	Win	94	338,939
(England) Seve Benson*	6	111,529	28	13	T4	120	250,786
(Italy) Alessandro Tadini	7	106,893	29	17	T13	126	232,759
(Scotland) Richie Ramsay*	8	106,656	29	14	T4	97	331,171
(Scotland) Steven O'Hara	9	103,212	24	12	T6	151	154,198
(Denmark) Jeppe Huldahl	10	96,818	28	14	Win	64	510,381
(Sweden) Klas Eriksson	11	98,514	24	13	T9	142	186,980
(Brazil) Alexandre Rocha	12	93,684	19	9	T28	211	47,935
(England) Richard Bland	13	92,645	25	14	4	112	277,462
(Spain) Rafa Cabrera-Bello	14	89,847	32	20	Win	39	744,297
(Netherlands) Wil Besseling*	15	89,358	23	12	T3	182	87,095
(England) Marcus Higley	16	85,946	17	9	T4	171	96,626
(England) John E. Morgan	17	77,254	16	7	T9	182	82,889
(Sweden) Christian Nilsson	18	75,200	15	8	Win	90	343,763
(Finland) Antti Ahokas*	19	74,867	12	4	T48	275	10,631
(England) Stuart Davis*	20	67,105	14	4	T15	208	50,375

* European Tour rookie in 2009
T = Tied
The player retained his European Tour card for 2010 (finished inside the top 120).
The player did not retain his European Tour Tour card for 2010, but retained conditional status (finished between 121-153).
The player did not retain his European Tour card for 2010 (finished outside the top 153).

Remkes won three Challenge Tour events in 2008.

== Winners on the European Tour in 2009 ==
No.	Date	Player	Tournament	Winning score	Margin of victory	Runner-up
1	22 Mar	(Argentina) Estanislao Goya	Madeira Islands Open BPI - Portugal	−6 (68-68-69-73=278)	1 stroke	(Scotland) Callum Macaulay
2	7 Jun	(Denmark) Jeppe Huldahl	Celtic Manor Wales Open	−9 (69-71-68-67=275)	1 stroke	(Sweden) Niclas Fasth
3	21 Jun	(Sweden) Christian Nilsson	Saint-Omer Open	−13 (68-69-65-69=271)	6 strokes	(Portugal) José-Filipe Lima
4	20 Sep	(Spain) Rafa Cabrera-Bello	Austrian Golf Open	−20 (71-67-66-60=264)	1 stroke	(England) Benn Barham

== Runners-up on the European Tour in 2009 ==
No.	Date	Player	Tournament	Winner	Winning score	Runner-up score
1	21 Dec 2008	(Northern Ireland) Gareth Maybin lost in playoff	South African Open Championship	(South Africa) Richard Sterne	−14 (72-69-67-66=274)	−14 (66-69-69-70=274)
2	15 Feb 2009	(England) David Horsey	Maybank Malaysian Open	(United States) Anthony Kang	−17 (74-66-64-67=271)	−16 (71-68-69-64=272)
3	25 Oct	(Sweden) Christian Nilsson	Castelló Masters Costa Azahar	(Sweden) Michael Jonzon	−20 (64-68-65-67=264)	−19 (69-66-65-65=265)

== See also ==
- 2008 European Tour Qualifying School graduates
