= Peugeot Challenge =

Peugeot Challenge R.C.G. El Prat
Tournament information
- Location: Barcelona, Spain
- Established: 2004
- Course: Real Club de Golf El Prat
- Par: 72
- Length: 7,070 yards (6,460 m)
- Tour: Challenge Tour
- Format: Stroke play
- Prize fund: €120,000
- Month played: April
- Final year: 2006

Tournament record score
- Aggregate: 278 David Drysdale (2006)
- To par: −10 as above

Final champion
- (Scotland) David Drysdale
- Location in Spain Location in Catalonia

The Peugeot Challenge was a golf tournament on the Challenge Tour that was played in Spain from 2004 to 2006.

== Winners ==
Year	Winner	Score	To par	Margin of victory	Runner-up	Venue
Peugeot Challenge R.C.G. El Prat
2006	(Scotland) David Drysdale	278	−10	2 strokes	(Sweden) Johan Axgren	R.C.G. El Prat
2005	(Spain) Tomás Jesús Muñoz	287	−1	1 stroke	(Paraguay) Marco Ruiz	R.C.G. El Prat
Peugeot Challenge de León
2004	(England) Edward Rush	276	−8	Playoff	(Spain) Álvaro Salto	Golf de León
