= Ben Mason (golfer) =

English golfer (born 1977)

Personal information
- Nationality: England
- Born: 2 March 1977 (age 49) Dewsbury, West Yorkshire, England
- Height: 5 ft 9 in (1.75 m)
- Weight: 168 lb (76 kg; 12.0 st)

Career
- Sport: Golf
- Turned professional: 1999
- Former tours: European Tour; Challenge Tour
- Professional wins: 2

Number of wins by tour
- Challenge Tour: 1
- Other: 1

Ben Mason (born 2 March 1977) is an English professional golfer.

== Career ==
In 1998, he reached the semifinals of The Amateur Championship.

In 1999, Mason turned professional. He joined the second-tier Challenge Tour in 2001 and from 2003 to 2005 he played full-time on the European Tour where his best finish was second in the 2003 Aa St Omer Open. However, he never finished within the top 120 money earners who maintain their tour rights automatically; his best Order of Merit finish was 134th in 2005.

In 2006, Mason returned to playing the Challenge Tour full-time where he recorded his first professional win in 2007 at the Open Mahou de Madrid.

== Professional wins (2) ==
=== Challenge Tour wins (1) ===
No.	Date	Tournament	Winning score	Margin of victory	Runners-up
1	27 May 2007	Open Mahou de Madrid	−8 (70-66-69=205) (Note: Shortened to 54 holes due to weather.)	1 stroke	(England) Tim Milford, (Spain) Álvaro Velasco

Challenge Tour playoff record (0–1)

No.	Year	Tournament	Opponent	Result
1	2006	Estoril Challenge	(Wales) Kyron Sullivan	Lost to par on first extra hole

=== Other wins (1) ===
- 2014 Leeds Cup
