= José Manuel Carriles =

Spanish professional golfer

Personal information
- Full name: José Manuel Carriles Corino
- Nationality: Spain
- Born: 12 May 1963 (age 63) Pedreña, Spain
- Height: 1.83 m (6 ft 0 in)

Career
- Sport: Golf
- Turned professional: 1982
- Current tour: European Senior Tour
- Former tours: European Tour; Challenge Tour
- Professional wins: 3

Number of wins by tour
- Challenge Tour: 2
- European Senior Tour: 1

Best results in major championships
- Masters Tournament: DNP
- PGA Championship: DNP
- U.S. Open: DNP
- The Open Championship: CUT: 1993, 2000

José Manuel Carriles Corino (born 12 May 1963) is a Spanish professional golfer.

== Early life ==
Carriles was born in Pedreña in northern Spain, the birthplace of the late Seve Ballesteros. Like Ballesteros, he learned the game on the beach, where he and some friends shared a half set of clubs.

Golf was always in the blood, his father caddied at the local course and his mother also worked there. He was forbidden to play at the club except once a year in the caddies' competition, so as a youngster he used to climb the fence at the furthest point of the course for some secret practice.

== Career ==
Carriles turned professional in 1983, and earned his European Tour card for the first time at the 1991 Qualifying School.

His best finish on the European Tour came in 1992, at the German Open where he finished runner-up, 11 strokes behind Vijay Singh. He finished the season 57th in the rankings.

Over the next 15 years he divided his time between the European Tour and the Challenge Tour, winning twice on the latter, the 1993 Estoril Challenge and the 2003 Challenge Tour Grand Final. He was also runner-up at the 2003 Izki Challenge de España, the 2006 Lexus Open and the Norwegian Challenge in 2006.

After finishing in third place at the 2013 Qualifying School Final, he joined the European Senior Tour. In 2015 he recorded three top-10 finishes, and clinched his first win in 2019 at the European Tour Destinations Senior Classic at PGA Catalunya Resort, Spain.

== Professional wins (3) ==
=== Challenge Tour wins (2) ===
Legend
Tour Championships (1)
Other Challenge Tour (1)

No.	Date	Tournament	Winning score	Margin of victory	Runner-up
1	19 Oct 1997	Estoril Challenge	−12 (64-70-70-72=276)	1 stroke	(Sweden) Kalle Brink
2	26 Oct 2003	Challenge Tour Grand Final	−11 (68-69-66-70=273)	Playoff	(Sweden) Johan Edfors

Challenge Tour playoff record (1–1)

No.	Year	Tournament	Opponent	Result
1	1997	Open des Volcans	(Wales) Mark Litton	
2	2003	Challenge Tour Grand Final	(Sweden) Johan Edfors	Won with birdie on first extra hole

=== European Senior Tour wins (1) ===
No.	Date	Tournament	Winning score	Margin of victory	Runner-up
1	14 Jul 2019	European Tour Destinations Senior Classic	−13 (70-66-67=203)	3 strokes	(South Africa) Chris Williams

== Results in major championships ==
Tournament	1993	1994	1995	1996	1997	1998	1999	2000
The Open Championship	CUT							CUT

Did not play

CUT = missed the halfway cut
Note: Carriles only played in The Open Championship.

== See also ==
- 2006 European Tour Qualifying School graduates
