= Álvaro Salto =

Spanish professional golfer

Personal information
- Full name: Álvaro Salto Johansson
- Nationality: Spain
- Born: 11 January 1974 (age 52) Málaga, Spain
- Height: 6 ft 2 in (1.88 m)
- Weight: 220 lb (100 kg; 16 st)

Career
- Sport: Golf
- Turned professional: 1997
- Former tours: European Tour; Challenge Tour
- Professional wins: 4

Number of wins by tour
- Challenge Tour: 3
- Other: 1

Álvaro Salto Johansson (born 11 January 1974) is a Spanish professional golfer and former European Tour player.

== Amateur career ==
Salto won the 1993 French Open Amateur Championship 4 and 3 over Thomas Besancenez. In 1996, he won the World University Golf Championship in Switzerland and represented Spain in the Eisenhower Trophy with Sergio García, José Manuel Lara and Ivó Giner, where they finished third behind Australia and Sweden. He turned professional the following year.

== Professional career ==
Salto joined the Challenge Tour in 1998 and won the Eulen Open Galea in his rookie season. He picked up his second win on Tour in 2000 at the Credit Suisse Private Banking Open. In 2001 he went through qualifying school to earn his European Tour card for 2002. He struggled in his rookie season but earned his tour card for 2003 through qualifying school. He returned to the Challenge Tour in 2004 and remained on tour until 2008. He picked up his third win on Tour in 2006 at the Parco di Monza Challenge. Since 2008 he has been playing on tour part-time.

== Amateur wins ==
- 1993 French Open Amateur Championship (Trophée Gordon Bennett)
- 1996 World University Golf Championship

== Professional wins (4) ==
=== Challenge Tour wins (3) ===
No.	Date	Tournament	Winning score	Margin of victory	Runner-up
1	27 Sep 1998	Eulen Open Galea	−8 (67-68-77-68=280)	1 stroke	(England) Daren Lee
2	7 May 2000	Credit Suisse Private Banking Open	−16 (64-68-69-67=268)	1 stroke	(Italy) Michele Reale
3	14 May 2006	Parco di Monza Challenge	−13 (65-71-66-69=271)	2 strokes	(England) Gareth Davies

Challenge Tour playoff record (0–1)

No.	Year	Tournament	Opponent	Result
1	2004	Peugeot Challenge de León	(England) Edward Rush	Lost to par on first extra hole

=== Alps Tour wins (1) ===
No.	Date	Tournament	Winning score	Margin of victory	Runner-up
1	10 Jul 2010	Peugeot Tour Madrid	−14 (65-67-67=199)	3 strokes	(Spain) Iñigo Urquizu

== Spanish national team appearances ==
- Eisenhower Trophy: 1996
