= Parco di Monza Challenge =

Tournament information
- Location: Monza, Italy
- Established: 2006
- Course: Golf Club Milano
- Par: 71
- Length: 7,003 yards (6,404 m)
- Tour: Challenge Tour
- Format: Stroke play
- Prize fund: €130,000
- Month played: May
- Final year: 2006

Tournament record score
- Aggregate: 271 Álvaro Salto (2006)
- To par: −13 as above

Final champion
- (Spain) Álvaro Salto
- Location in Italy Location in Lombardy

The Parco di Monza Challenge was a golf tournament on the Challenge Tour that was played in 2006 at Golf Club Milano in Monza near Milan, Italy. It was won by Spain's Álvaro Salto.

== Winners ==
Year	Winner	Score	To par	Margin of victory	Runner-up
2006	(Spain) Álvaro Salto	271	−13	2 strokes	(England) Gareth Davies
