= Estoril Challenge =

Former golf tournament on the Challenge Tour, in Portugal

Estoril Challenge de Portugal
Tournament information
- Location: Cascais, Portugal
- Established: 1997
- Course: Quinta da Marinha
- Par: 71
- Length: 6,418 yards (5,869 m)
- Tour: Challenge Tour
- Format: Stroke play
- Prize fund: €130,000
- Month played: June/July
- Final year: 2007

Tournament record score
- Aggregate: 272 Ross McGowan (2007)
- To par: −12 José Manuel Carriles (1997) −12 Ross McGowan (2007)

Final champion
- (England) Ross McGowan
- Location in Portugal

The Estoril Challenge de Portugal was a golf tournament on the Challenge Tour that was held near Estoril, on the Portuguese Riviera. It was first played in 1997. Then it took a 6-year hiatus until it was played again in 2004. It was not played in 2005 and then it returned in 2006 and 2007.

== Winners ==
Year	Winner	Score	To par	Margin of victory	Runner(s)-up	Venue
Estoril Challenge de Portugal
2007	(England) Ross McGowan	272	−12	3 strokes	(Wales) Stuart Manley	Quinta da Marinha
Estoril Challenge
2006	(Wales) Kyron Sullivan	284	−4	Playoff	(England) Ben Mason	Penha Longa
2005: No tournament
Estoril Challenge Open Portugal Telecom
2004	(England) Tom Whitehouse	274	−10	4 strokes	(Sweden) Kalle Brink	Oitavos
Estoril Challenge
1998–2003: No tournament
1997	(Spain) José Manuel Carriles	276	−12	1 stroke	(Sweden) Kalle Brink	Penha Longa
