= Mike Lorenzo-Vera =

French professional golfer (born 1985)

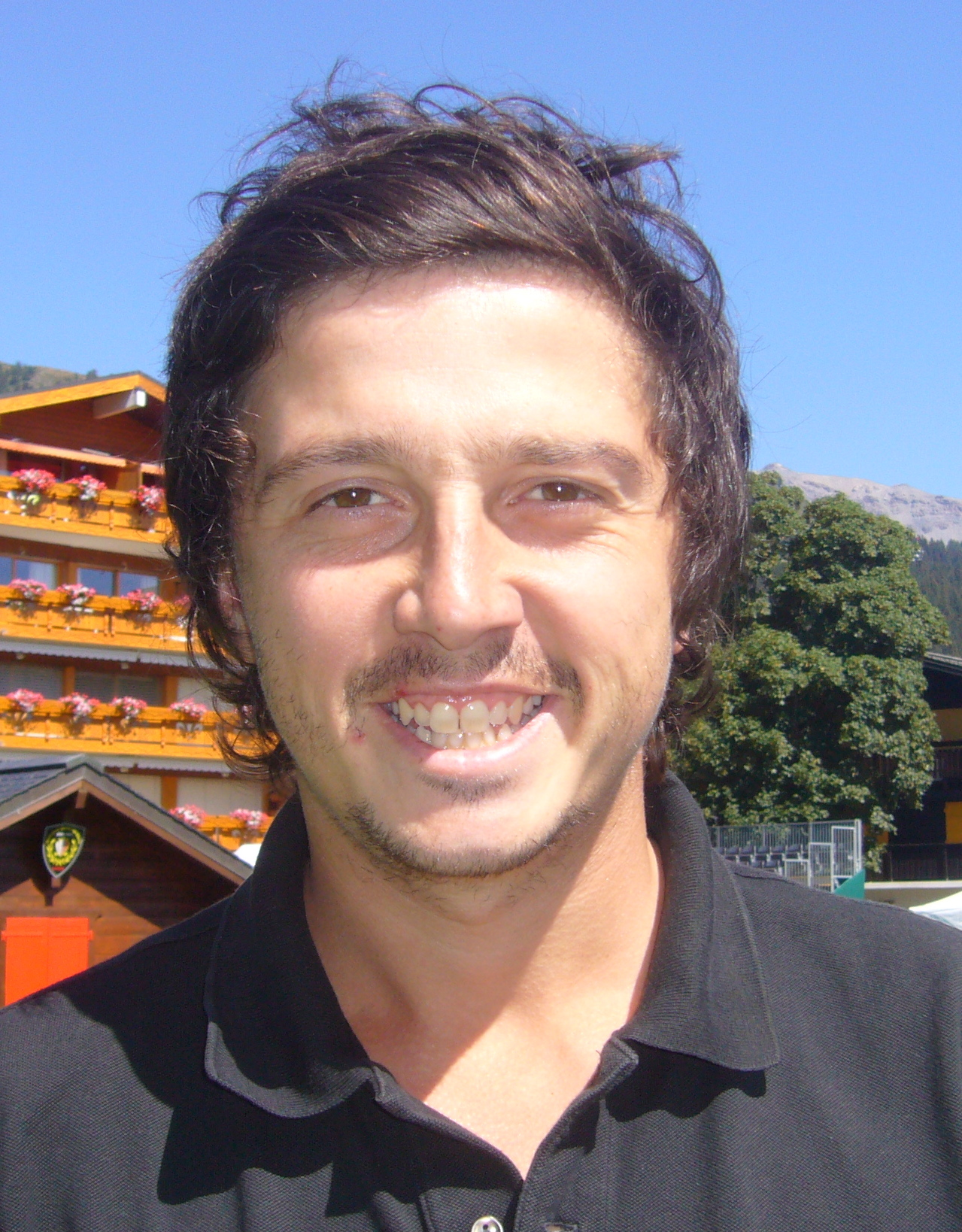

Personal information
- Full name: Michaël Lorenzo-Vera
- Nationality: France
- Born: 28 January 1985 (age 41) Bayonne, France
- Height: 1.79 m (5 ft 10 in)
- Weight: 70 kg (154 lb; 11 st 0 lb)

Career
- Sport: Golf
- Turned professional: 2005
- Former tours: European Tour; Challenge Tour; Alps Tour
- Professional wins: 7
- Highest ranking: 64 (26 January 2020) (as of 25 October 2026)

Number of wins by tour
- Challenge Tour: 1
- Other: 6

Best results in major championships
- Masters Tournament: DNP
- PGA Championship: T16: 2019
- U.S. Open: CUT: 2020
- The Open Championship: T62: 2017

Achievements and awards
- Challenge Tour Rankings winner: 2007

Michaël Lorenzo-Vera (born 28 January 1985) is a French former professional golfer who played on the European Tour.

== Career ==
Lorenzo-Vera was born in Bayonne, Pyrénées-Atlantiques in South-West France.

After turning professional in 2005, Lorenzo-Vera played on the Alps Tour, one of Europe's third tier development tours. In 2006, he won the Open International de la Mirabelle D’or, a tournament he had also won the year before as an amateur, on his way to 4th on the Order of Merit, which gave him a place on the Challenge Tour for the following season.

On Europe's second-tier tour in 2007, Lorenzo-Vera had recorded eight top-ten finishes going into the last event, the Apulia San Domenico Grand Final, and was 7th on the Challenge Tour's money list. He set a course record in the first round and went on to win the tournament, which catapulted him to the top of the end of season Challenge Tour Rankings and guaranteed his card on the top level European Tour for 2008.

The highlight of Lorenzo-Vera's first season on the European Tour was finishing as joint runner-up at the Volvo China Open, having led at half way. He ended the year ranked just outside the top 100 on the Order of Merit, but had done enough to retain his place on the tour.

In April 2025, Lorenzo-Vera announced his retirement from professional golf at the age of 40. Lorenzo-Vera played his last tournament at the 2025 Omega European Masters in Switzerland.

== Professional wins (7) ==
=== Challenge Tour wins (1) ===
Legend
Tour Championships (1)
Other Challenge Tour (0)

No.	Date	Tournament	Winning score	Margin of victory	Runners-up
1	27 Oct 2007	Apulia San Domenico Grand Final	−15 (62-71-70-66=269)	1 stroke	(Wales) Jamie Donaldson, (Netherlands) Joost Luiten, (Wales) Stuart Manley, (Scotland) Eric Ramsay

Challenge Tour playoff record (0–1)

No.	Year	Tournament	Opponent	Result
1	2007	Oceânico Developments Pro-Am Challenge	(England) Ross McGowan	Lost to par on second extra hole

=== Alps Tour wins (4) ===
No.	Date	Tournament	Winning score	Margin of victory	Runner(s)-up
1	4 Sep 2005	Open International de la Mirabelle d'Or (as an amateur)	−18 (63-69-69-69=270)	2 strokes	(France) Jean-Marc de Polo
2	10 Sep 2006	Open de la Mirabelle d'Or (2)	−17 (68-69-69-65=271)	1 stroke	(France) Christophe Brazillier, (France) Jacques Thalamy
3	14 Oct 2007	Masters 13	−15 (70-72-66-65=273)	6 strokes	(France) Jean-Pierre Cixous
4	13 Sep 2009	Allianz Open Stade Français Paris	+5 (73-72-74-74=293)	1 stroke	(France) Bruno-Teva Lecuona, (France) Fabien Marty, (France) Nicolas Mourlon, (France) Damien Perrier

=== French Tour wins (1) ===
No.	Date	Tournament	Winning score	Margin of victory	Runner-up
1	11 Apr 2009	Grand Prix Schweppes	−11 (70-70-66-67=273)	3 strokes	(France) Raphaël Jacquelin

=== Other wins (1) ===
- 2006 Open des Landes (France Pro Golf Tour)

== Playoff record ==
European Tour playoff record (0–1)

No.	Year	Tournament	Opponent	Result
1	2018	Rocco Forte Sicilian Open	(Sweden) Joakim Lagergren	Lost to birdie on first extra hole

== Results in major championships ==
Results not in chronological order in 2020.

Tournament	2017	2018
Masters Tournament		
U.S. Open		
The Open Championship	T62	
PGA Championship		T65

Tournament	2019	2020	2021
Masters Tournament			
PGA Championship	T16	T43	
U.S. Open		CUT	
The Open Championship	CUT	NT	CUT

Did not play

CUT = missed the half-way cut
"T" = tied
NT = No tournament due to COVID-19 pandemic

== Results in World Golf Championships ==
Tournament	2017	2018	2019	2020
Championship				66
Match Play				NT^{1}
Invitational				
Champions	T67		T38	NT^{1}

^{1}Cancelled due to COVID-19 pandemic

Did not play

"T" = Tied
NT = No tournament

== Team appearances ==
Amateur

- European Boys' Team Championship (representing France): 2002, 2003
- Jacques Léglise Trophy (representing Continental Europe): 2002, 2003
- European Amateur Team Championship (representing France): 2005

Professional

- World Cup (representing France): 2018

== See also ==
- 2007 Challenge Tour graduates
- 2014 Challenge Tour graduates
- 2022 European Tour Qualifying School graduates
