= Open Mahou de Madrid =

Tournament information
- Location: Madrid, Spain
- Established: 2005
- Course: Casino Club de Golf Retamares
- Par: 71
- Length: 6,575 yards (6,012 m)
- Tour: Challenge Tour
- Format: Stroke play
- Prize fund: €130,000
- Month played: May
- Final year: 2007

Tournament record score
- Aggregate: 263 Benn Barham (2005)
- To par: −21 as above

Final champion
- (England) Ben Mason
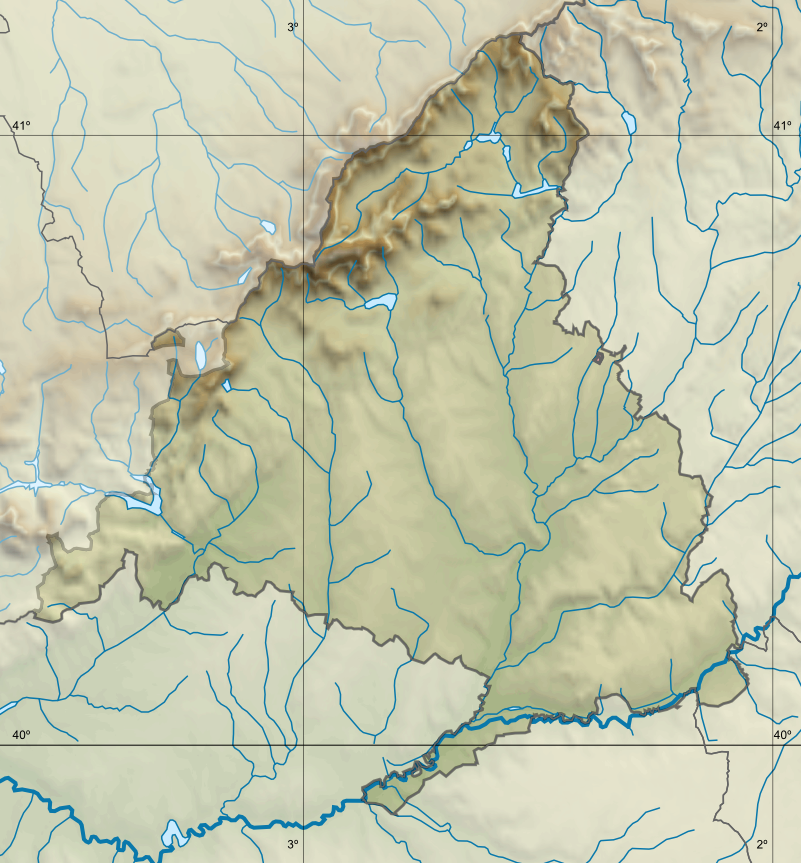
- Location in Spain Location in the Community of Madrid

The Open Mahou de Madrid was a men's professional golf tournament on the Challenge Tour from 2005 to 2007.

There is also a Madrid Open on the European Tour.

== Tournament hosts ==
- 2007 – Casino Club de Golf Retamares
- 2006 – Club de Golf La Herreria
- 2005 – Club de Golf La Herreria

== Winners ==
Year	Winner	Score	To par	Margin of victory	Runner(s)-up
2007	(England) Ben Mason	205 (Note: Shortened to 54 holes due to weather.)	−8	1 stroke	(England) Tim Milford (Spain) Álvaro Velasco
2006	(Spain) Juan Parrón	271	−13	Playoff	(Spain) Luis Claverie (Spain) Santiago Luna
2005	(England) Benn Barham	263	−23	4 strokes	(Sweden) Fredrik Widmark
