= Thomas Bjørn Open =

Tournament information
- Location: Jutland, Denmark
- Established: 2005
- Course: Horsens Golfklub
- Par: 72
- Length: 7,035 yards (6,433 m)
- Tours: Challenge Tour; Nordic Golf League
- Format: Stroke play
- Prize fund: €120,000
- Month played: June
- Final year: 2006

Tournament record score
- Aggregate: 277 Marcus Higley (2006)
- To par: −11 as above

Final champion
- (England) Marcus Higley
- Location in Denmark

The Thomas Bjørn Open was a golf tournament on the Challenge Tour in 2005 and 2006. It was sponsored by Denmark's leading European Tour player, and former Challenge Tour Rankings winner, Thomas Bjørn.

== Winners ==
Year	Tour (Note: CHA − Challenge Tour; NGL − Nordic Golf League.)	Winner	Score	To par	Margin of victory	Runner(s)-up	Venue
2007	NGL	Cancelled					
2006	CHA	(England) Marcus Higley	277	−11	2 strokes	(South Africa) Michiel Bothma (Italy) Alessio Bruschi (Wales) Gareth Davies (England) Denny Lucas	Horsens
2005	CHA	(Finland) Toni Karjalainen	288	+4	1 stroke	(Sweden) Oskar Bergman	Esbjerg
