= Jean-Baptiste Gonnet =

French professional golfer

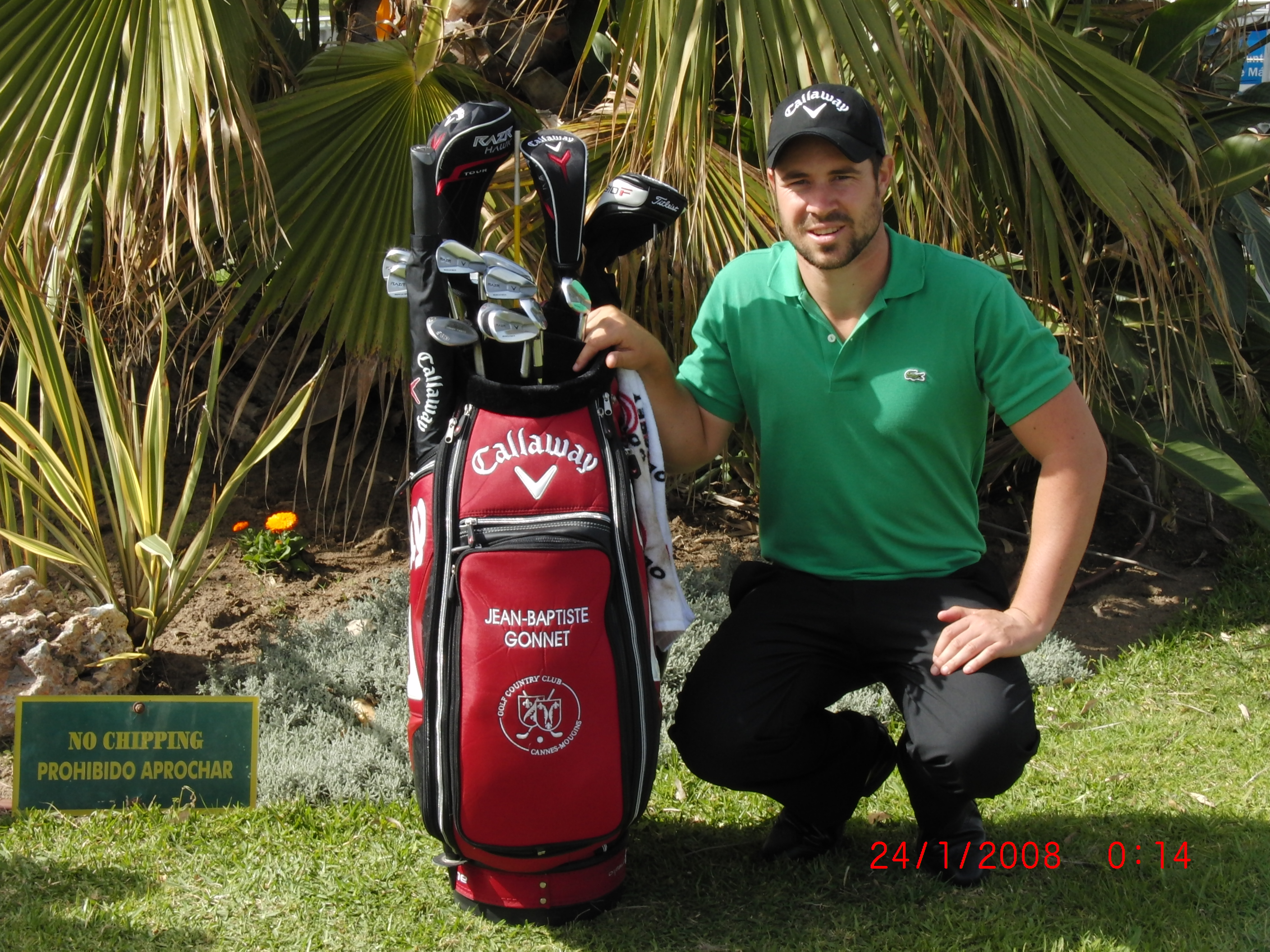

Personal information
- Full name: Jean-Baptiste Gonnet
- Nationality: France
- Born: 28 September 1982 (age 44) Cannes, France
- Height: 1.76 m (5 ft 9 in)
- Weight: 70 kg (150 lb; 11 st)

Career
- Sport: Golf
- Turned professional: 2004
- Current tour: European Tour
- Former tours: Challenge Tour; Alps Tour
- Professional wins: 1

Best results in major championships
- Masters Tournament: DNP
- PGA Championship: DNP
- U.S. Open: DNP
- The Open Championship: T67: 2008

Jean-Baptiste Gonnet (born 28 September 1982) is a French professional golfer.

== Career ==
In 1982, Gonnet was born in Cannes, France.

In 2004, Gonnet turned professional. He played on the Challenge Tour from 2004 to 2006. Gonnet finished 17th in the 2006 Order of Merit to earn a place on the European Tour for 2007. He competed on the European Tour until 2013. His best season was his debut year in 2007, when he finished 90th in the Order of Merit. He also recorded his best tournament result to date in 2007, finishing tied for second place at the Scandinavian Masters. He failed to retain his place on the European Tour after 2013 and played on the Challenge Tour from 2014 to 2016 and the Alps Tour in 2017.

== Amateur wins ==
- 2003 Mexico International Amateur Championship

== Professional wins ==
- 2008 Championship de Barbaroux

== Results in major championships ==
| Tournament | 2008 |
|---|---|
| The Open Championship | T67 |

Note: Gonnet only played in The Open Championship.
"T" = tied

== Team appearances ==
Amateur

- European Amateur Team Championship (representing France): 2003

== See also ==
- 2006 Challenge Tour graduates
- 2009 European Tour Qualifying School graduates
- 2019 European Tour Qualifying School graduates
