= Pedreña =

- Village
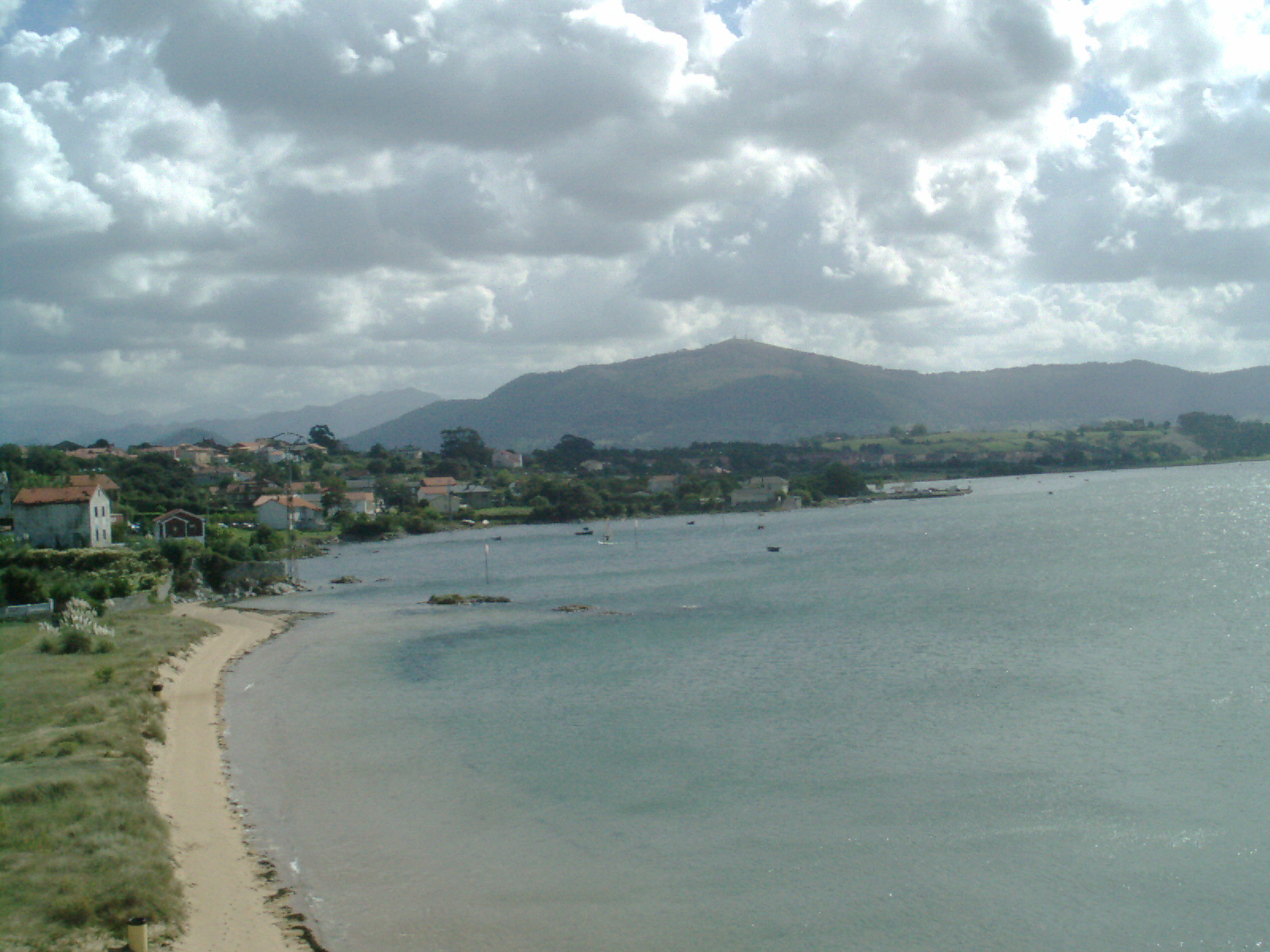

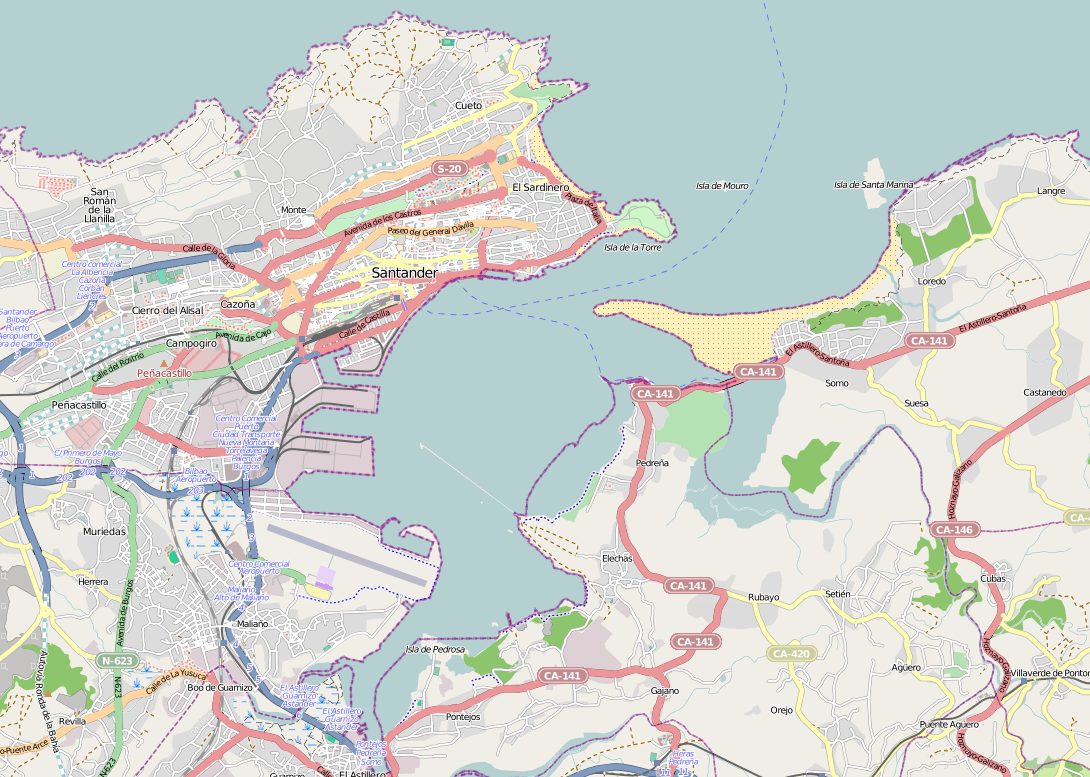
- Click twice to view

- Location in Cantabria
- Coordinates: 43°26′37″N 3°46′05″W
- Country: Spain
- Autonomous community: Cantabria
- Province: Cantabria
- Comarca: Trasmiera
- Judicial district: Medio Cudeyo
- Municipality: Marina de Cudeyo
- Elevation: 38 m (125 ft)

Population (2010)
  - Total: 1,454
- Time zone: UTC+1 (CET)
  - Summer (DST): UTC+2 (CEST)
- Postal code: 39130

Pedreña is a village in the municipality of Marina de Cudeyo, Cantabria, northern Spain. As of 2010, its population was 1,454.

Although located 18 kilometres (11 mi) from Santander by road, it lies on a peninsula only about 2 kilometres (1.2 mi) across the bay from Santander, separated from land to the east by the mouth of the Miera River. Pedreña and other parts of Santander Bay can be reached by boats which leave from Santander at regular intervals.

The most famous son of Pedreña is golfer Seve Ballesteros (1957–2011); the main avenue in the village is named after him.

== History ==
Pedreña Cemetery is located in the ruins of the ancient parish church. The church was under the patronage of San Pedro de Ambojo. This name appears in several documents to refer to the current location of Pedreña. This medieval church is dated to the 14th or 15th century. During the Spanish Civil War the church was destroyed and left as a ruin. The golf course, Real Golf de Pedreña, lies on the coast to the east of the village and opened in 1928 with fine views of the bay of Santander.

In 1983, during development works, several slab tombs revealed a collection of some 72 silver medieval coins, which have been dated between the late eleventh and early twelfth centuries. This important "hoard" is preserved in the Regional Museum of Prehistory and Archaeology and the cemetery was declared a site of Cultural Interest in 2002.

The present parish church, Iglesia de San Pedro was built in 1950s and its construction attempted to revive elements of traditional religious architecture in the area. The work of the church belongs to the artist and painter Santander Fernando Calderon, inspired by Byzantine frescoes.

The main festival held here is San Pedro Pedreña, a festival with great tradition. It is attended by many people from both the municipality and other surrounding towns, on 29 June every year, near the golf course. Fishing is also popular in Pedreña.

== Geography ==
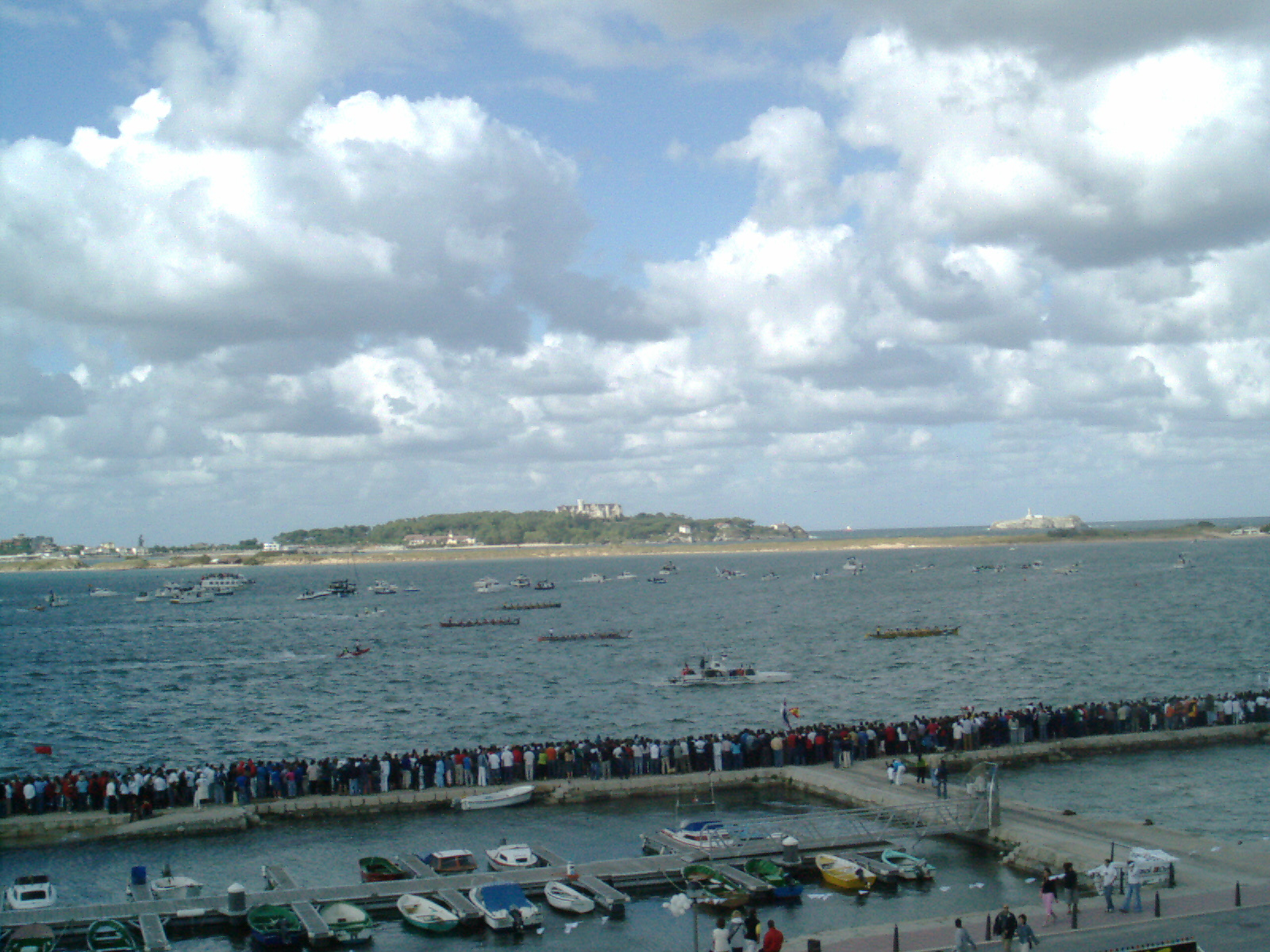
Pedreña Regatta

Pedreña lies on a peninsula only about 2 kilometres (1.2 mi) across the bay from Santander. The main road through the village is the CA-141 which connects it to village of Somo just across the mouth of the Miera River to the east of the village. Rubayo lies along this road, 3 kilometres (1.9 mi) to the south of the village. A small marina lies on the sea front, 20 metres (66 ft) from the golf course and a regatta is also held.

== Notable landmarks ==
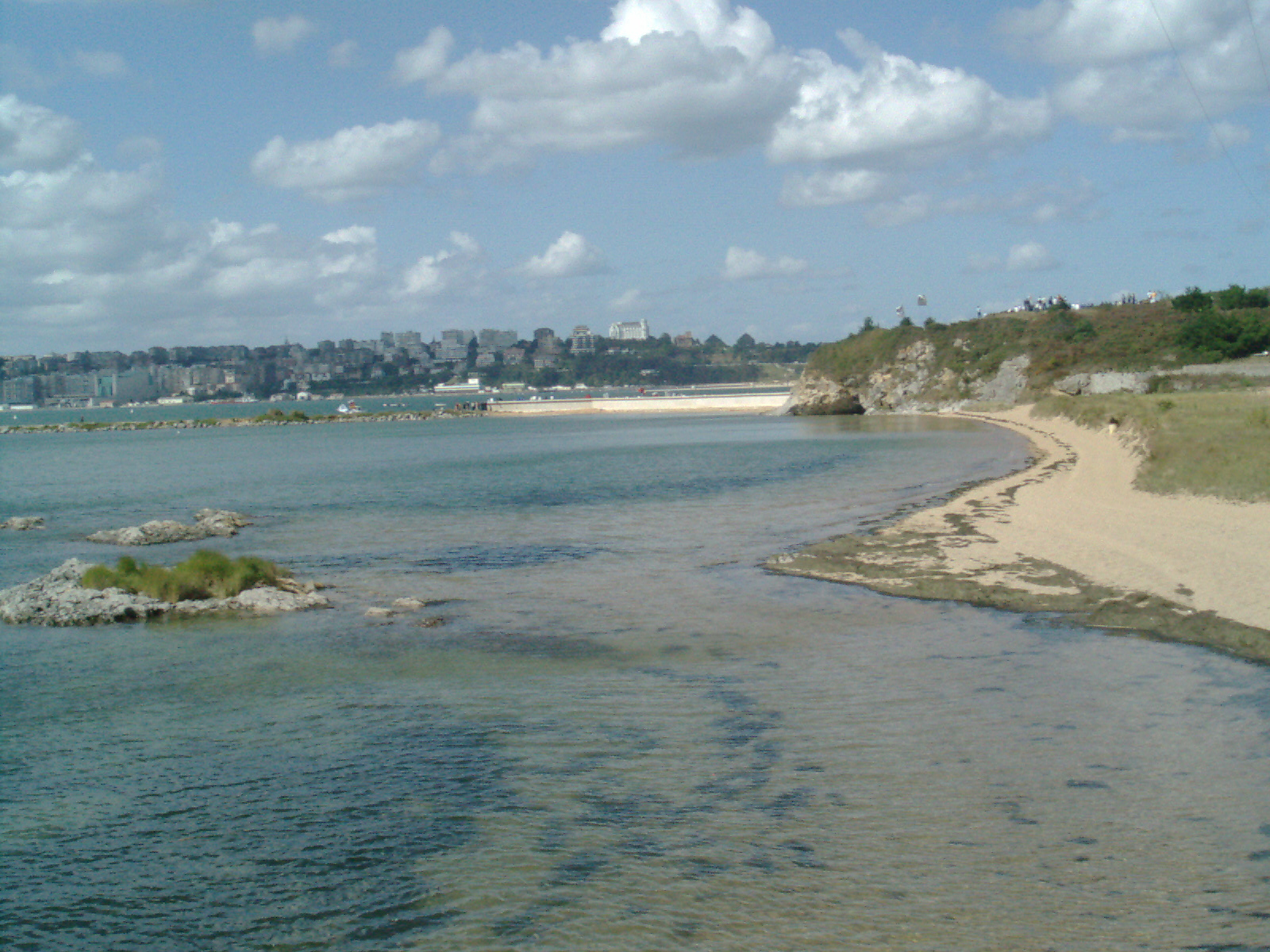
Playa de Pedreña

- Real Golf de Pedreña
- Puerto Deportivo de Marina Pedreña
- Iglesia parroquial de San Pedro
- Casa de los Padres Jesuitas o del Conde Portillo
- Casa de Nocedal
- Escuelas

== Notable people ==
Golfer Seve Ballesteros (1957–2011) was born and died in Pedreña. He learned the game while playing on the beaches near his home, at the time while he was supposed to be in school, mainly using a 3-iron given to him by his older brother Manuel when he was eight years old. Also born or living in this village were golfers Ramón Sota Ocejo (1938–2012), an uncle of Ballesteros, and José Manuel Carriles Corino (1963), the hockey player Pilar González Noval (1959) and the basketball player David Doblas (1981). The main avenue is named after Ballesteros.

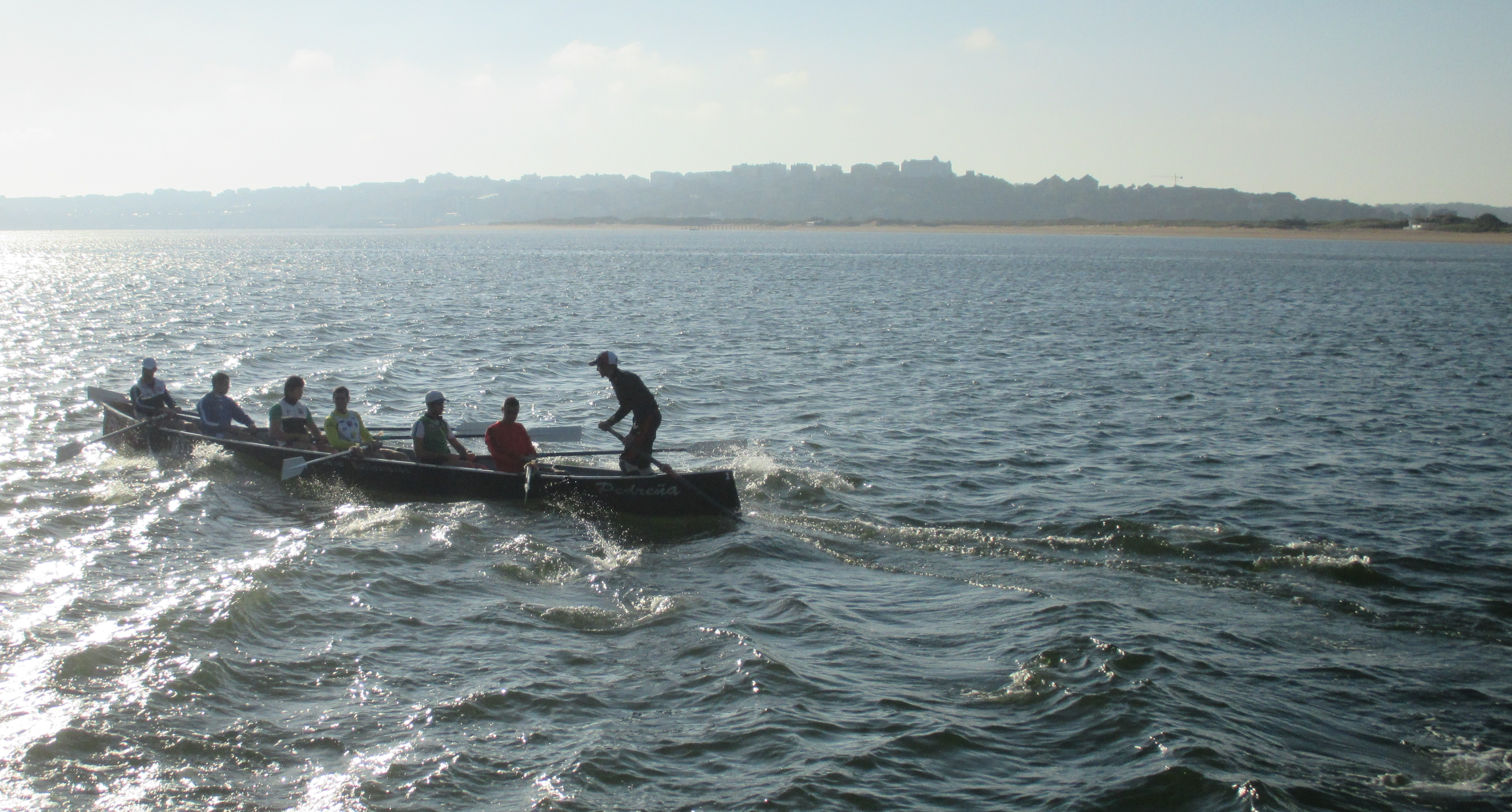
Training trainera, Pedreña Team
