= Sicilian Open =

Coordinates: 37.4741°N 13.1927°E

Tournament information
- Location: Sicily, Italy
- Established: 2011
- Courses: Verdura Golf & Spa Resort
- Par: 72
- Length: 7,375 yards (6,744 m)
- Tour: European Tour
- Format: Stroke play
- Prize fund: €1,000,000
- Month played: May
- Final year: 2018

Tournament record score
- Aggregate: 268 Joakim Lagergren (2018); 268 Mike Lorenzo-Vera (2018)
- To par: −16 as above

Final champion
- (Sweden) Joakim Lagergren
- Location in Italy Location in Sicily

The Sicilian Open was a European Tour men's professional golf tournament. It was played for the first time in 2011. The event was held in Sicily at the Donnafugata Golf Resort & Spa. In 2012 the event was held at Verdura Golf & Spa Resort on a links-style course running up to the coastline. After a four-year hiatus, the tournament returned to the European Tour schedule in 2017 and 2018 at Verdura, with Rocco Forte Hotels the title sponsor. As of 2019, the event is no longer held.

== Winners ==
Year	Winner	Score	To par	Margin of victory	Runner-up
Rocco Forte Sicilian Open
2018	(Sweden) Joakim Lagergren	268	−16	Playoff	(France) Mike Lorenzo-Vera
Rocco Forte Open
2017	(Spain) Álvaro Quirós	270	−14	Playoff	(South Africa) Zander Lombard
Sicilian Open
2013–2016: No tournament
2012	(Denmark) Thorbjørn Olesen	273	−15	1 stroke	(England) Chris Wood
2011	(France) Raphaël Jacquelin	272	−12	1 stroke	(England) Anthony Wall
