= Oceânico Group Pro-Am Challenge =

Tournament information
- Location: Worsley, Greater Manchester, England
- Established: 2004
- Courses: Marriott Worsley Park Hotel and Country Club
- Par: 70
- Length: 6,794 yards (6,212 m)
- Tour: Challenge Tour
- Format: Stroke play
- Prize fund: €150,000
- Month played: May/June
- Final year: 2008

Tournament record score
- Aggregate: 264 Alessandro Tadini (2008)
- To par: −16 as above

Final champion
- (Italy) Alessandro Tadini
- Location in England Location in Greater Manchester

The Oceânico Group Pro-Am Challenge was a golf tournament on the Challenge Tour played from 2004 to 2008 at the Marriott Worsley Park Hotel & Country Club in Greater Manchester, England.

== Winners ==
Year	Winner	Score	To par	Margin of victory	Runner(s)-up
Oceânico Group Pro-Am Challenge
2008	(Italy) Alessandro Tadini	264	−16	1 stroke	(Switzerland) Raphaël De Sousa
Oceânico Developments Pro-Am Challenge
2007	(England) Ross McGowan	265	−15	Playoff	(France) Mike Lorenzo-Vera
Morson International Pro-Am Challenge
2006	(Spain) Álvaro Quirós	267	−13	4 strokes	(Wales) Mark Pilkington
2005	(Argentina) Andrés Romero	271	−9	1 stroke	(Wales) Sion Bebb (England) Richard McEvoy (Italy) Marco Soffietti
JJB Sports North West Challenge
2004	(Sweden) Fredrik Henge	272	−8	1 stroke	(England) Lee Slattery
