= 2006 European Tour Qualifying School graduates =

This is a list of the 35 players who earned their 2007 European Tour card through Q School in 2006.

Place	Player	European Tour starts	Cuts made	Notes
T1	(Spain) Carlos Rodiles	174	96	
T1	(Brazil) Alexandre Rocha	30	17	1 Tour de las Américas win; 1 Canadian Tour win
3	(Scotland) David Drysdale	111	53	2 Challenge Tour wins
4	(England) Oliver Fisher	2	0	
5	(Sweden) Fredrik Andersson Hed	167	82	2 Challenge Tour wins
T6	(Germany) Sven Strüver	373	222	3 European Tour wins
T6	(Sweden) Patrik Sjöland	258	157	2 European Tour wins; 1 Asian Tour win
T6	(United States) Notah Begay III	13	9	4 PGA Tour wins
T9	(Spain) Carl Suneson	227	116	5 Challenge Tour wins
T9	(France) Julien Forêt	2	1	1 Challenge Tour win
T9	(England) Warren Bennett	133	75	1 European Tour win
T9	(England) Sam Little	76	39	2 Challenge Tour wins
T13	(Spain) Santiago Luna	509	306	1 European Tour win
T13	(Wales) Sion Bebb	32	17	1 Challenge Tour win
T13	(Australia) Wade Ormsby	83	41	
T13	(Norway) Eirik Tage Johansen	0	0	
T17	(Spain) Jesús María Arruti	91	52	
T17	(Germany) Alex Čejka	236	177	4 European Tour wins
T17	(Japan) Taichi Teshima	5	3	5 Japan Golf Tour wins
T17	(New Zealand) Steven Alker	38	17	3 PGA Tour of Australasia wins; 1 Nationwide Tour win
T17	(Australia) Matthew Zions	0	0	
T17	(Sweden) Henrik Nyström	177	82	
T17	(England) Richard McEvoy	71	25	1 Challenge Tour win
T24	(England) Andrew Raitt	106	54	
T24	(Iceland) Birgir Hafþórsson	13	5	
T24	(France) François Calmels	2	0	
T24	(Australia) Andrew Tampion	0	0	
T24	(Sweden) Pelle Edberg	30	12	
T24	(England) Matthew Richardson	1	1	Won the 2004 European Amateur
T30	(England) Edward Rush	18	5	
T30	(Argentina) Daniel Vancsik	42	18	3 Challenge Tour wins
T30	(Spain) Manuel Quirós	6	2	
T30	(Spain) José Manuel Carriles	185	92	
T30	(Spain) Álvaro Quirós	4	3	1 Challenge Tour win; 18th in the Challenge Tour rankings
T30	(Spain) Luís Claverie	16	6	

2007 European Tour rookie

== 2007 results ==
Player	Starts	Cuts made	Best finish	Money list rank	Earnings (€)
(Spain) Carlos Rodiles	25	14	3	86	308,710
(Brazil) Alexandre Rocha	25	10	7	159	141,389
(Scotland) David Drysdale	24	8	T16	195	62,166
(England) Oliver Fisher*	29	15	T9	109	242,067
(Sweden) Fredrik Andersson Hed	26	20	T2	45	725,255
(Germany) Sven Strüver	28	17	T7	125	198,902
(Sweden) Patrik Sjöland	25	12	3	133	179,138
(United States) Notah Begay III*	10	5	T31	221	36,598
(Spain) Carl Suneson	29	15	Win	123	202,211
(France) Julien Foret*	12	2	T55	331	3,714
(England) Warren Bennett	7	1	T40	307	5,900
(England) Sam Little	26	16	2	76	388,453
(Spain) Santiago Luna	22	10	T2	135	176,069
(Wales) Sion Bebb*	22	8	4	155	147,998
(Australia) Wade Ormsby	27	13	T2	145	162,668
(Norway) Eirik Tage Johansen*	18	5	T29	215	39,853
(Spain) Jesús María Arruti	19	10	T12	171	116,044
(Germany) Alex Čejka	3	2	T14	252	18,400
(Japan) Taichi Teshima*	19	9	T6	153	150,257
(New Zealand) Steven Alker	21	12	T3	148	154,316
(Australia) Matthew Zions*	22	8	T9	175	99,045
(Sweden) Henrik Nyström	24	13	T3	112	231,818
(England) Richard McEvoy	22	8	T7	173	106,657
(England) Andrew Raitt	24	4	T5	208	50,949
(Iceland) Birgir Hafþórsson*	18	10	T11	184	77,955
(France) François Calmels*	15	3	T2	207	52,707
(Australia) Andrew Tampion*	24	10	T2	161	139,634
(Sweden) Pelle Edberg	28	14	T3	51	629,614
(England) Matthew Richardson*	17	4	66	288	8,885
(England) Edward Rush*	25	10	T6	162	136,683
(Argentina) Daniel Vancsik	28	12	Win	75	390,382
(Spain) Manuel Quirós*	17	6	T20	196	61,880
(Spain) José Manuel Carriles	15	3	T38	247	19,494
(Spain) Álvaro Quirós*	13	7	Win	102	259,350
(Spain) Luís Claverie*	18	8	T17	193	63,328

* European Tour rookie in 2007
T = Tied
The player retained his European Tour card for 2008 (finished inside the top 117, or won).
The player did not retain his European Tour Tour card for 2008, but retained conditional status (finished between 118 and 149).
The player did not retain his European Tour card for 2008 (finished outside the top 149).

== Winners on the European Tour in 2007 ==
No.	Date	Player	Tournament	Winning score	Margin of victory	Runners-up
1	10 Dec 2006	(Spain) Álvaro Quirós	Alfred Dunhill Championship	−13 (74-66-68-67=275)	1 stroke	(South Africa) Charl Schwartzel
2	25 Mar	(Argentina) Daniel Vancsik	Madeira Islands Open BPI	−18 (68-66-68-68=270)	7 strokes	(South Africa) David Frost (Spain) Santiago Luna
3	17 Jun	(Spain) Carl Suneson	Open de Saint-Omer	−8 (67-70-70-69=276)	3 strokes	(France) François Calmels (Australia) Peter Fowler (England) Marcus Higley

== Runners-up on the European Tour in 2007 ==
No.	Date	Player	Tournament	Winner	Winning score	Runner-up score
1	3 Dec 2006	(Australia) Wade Ormsby	Blue Chip New Zealand Open	(Australia) Nathan Green	−5 (71-67-76-65=279)	−3 (72-63-76-70=281)
2	18 Feb	(Australia) Andrew Tampion	Enjoy Jakarta Astro Indonesia Open	(Finland) Mikko Ilonen	−9 (66-68-71-70=275)	−8 (68-66-73-69=276)
3	25 Mar	(Spain) Santiago Luna	Madeira Islands Open BPI	(Argentina) Daniel Vancsik	−18 (68-66-68-68=270)	−11 (69-67-72-69=277)
4	13 May	(Sweden) Fredrik Andersson Hed	Valle Romano Open de Andalucía	(England) Lee Westwood	−20 (72-64-65-67=268)	−18 (69-71-64-66=270)
5	17 Jun	(France) François Calmels	Open de Saint-Omer	(Spain) Carl Suneson	−8 (67-70-70-69=276)	−5 (72-69-69-69=279)
6	28 Oct	(England) Sam Little	Mallorca Classic	(France) Grégory Bourdy	−12 (69-68-64-67=268)	−10 (66-69-68-67=270)

== See also ==
- 2006 Challenge Tour graduates
