= François Calmels =

French professional golfer

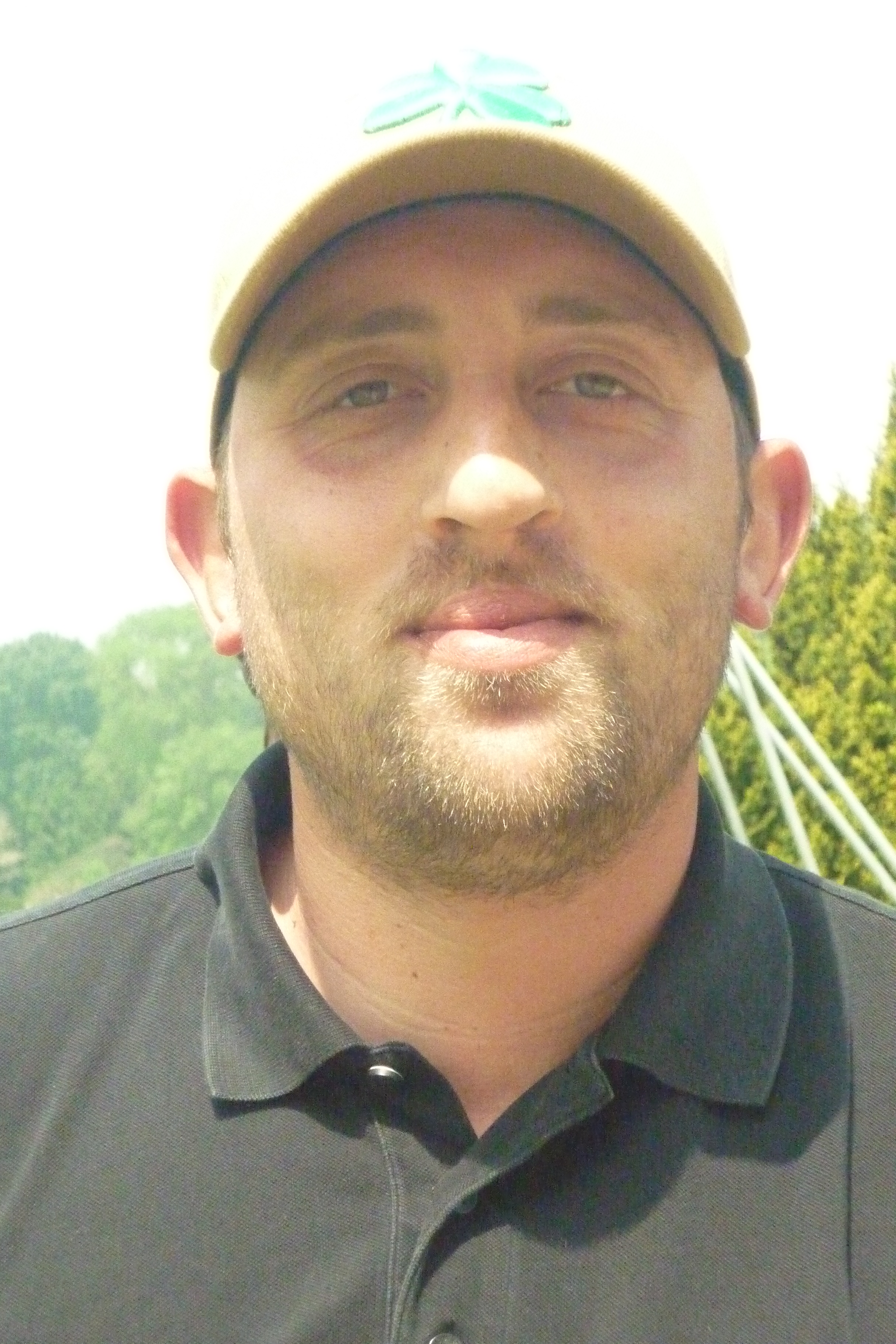

Personal information
- Nationality: France
- Born: 11 December 1981 (age 44) Paris, France
- Height: 1.80 m (5 ft 11 in)
- Weight: 82 kg (181 lb; 12.9 st)

Career
- Sport: Golf
- Turned professional: 2006
- Former tours: European Tour; Challenge Tour
- Professional wins: 7

Number of wins by tour
- Challenge Tour: 3
- Other: 4

Achievements and awards
- Alps Tour Order of Merit winner: 2006

François Calmels (born 11 December 1981) is a French professional golfer who currently plays on the European Tour.

== Early life ==
Calmels was born in Paris. Calmels turned seriously to golf at the age of eleven, he underwent several operations on his mouth after birth double cleft and was advised by doctors to take up a non-contact sport after being struck in the face playing handball – the game his father played in the French First Division – so he decided to concentrate on golf.

== Amateur career ==
Calmels was a distinguished amateur. He won the 2004 Coupe Mouchy (highest amateur competition in France) and the 2006 Portuguese Amateur Open Championship.

== Professional career ==
In 2006, Calmels turned professional and won twice during his first season on the Alps Tour, one of Europe's third tier developmental professional golf tours. He won for the first time on the second-tier European Challenge Tour in May 2009, when he claimed the Telenet Trophy by one stroke over Spaniard Carlos Rodiles - one week after watching his girlfriend, Jade Schaeffer make her Ladies European Tour breakthrough at the Hypo Vereinsbank Ladies German Open, he followed her into the winner's enclosure by birdieing the last two holes at Royal Waterloo Golf Club to win by one stroke.

In 2007 and 2010, Calmels played on both the European Tour and the Challenge Tour. His best finish on the European Tour was a tie for second at the 2007 Open de Saint-Omer, a tournament co-sanctioned by both tours. In November 2011 he was hurt in a lift accident and spent months recovering. He came back on Challenge Tour after Q school. In 2013, he was on Challenge Tour and finished the season 11th in ranking. He was back on European Tour for the 2014 season

== Personal life ==
Calmels has long been a friend of European Tour champion golfer and fellow Frenchman Grégory Havret.

== Amateur wins ==
- 2004 Coupe Murat (French Open Amateur Stroke Play Championship), Coupe Mouchy
- 2005 Portuguese International Amateur Open Championship

== Professional wins (7) ==
=== Challenge Tour wins (3) ===
No.	Date	Tournament	Winning score	Margin of victory	Runner(s)-up
1	31 May 2009	Telenet Trophy	−12 (67-69-70-70=276)	2 strokes	(Spain) Carlos Rodiles, (England) Sam Walker
2	27 Apr 2013	Challenge de Madrid	−17 (63-69-72-67=271)	7 strokes	(Finland) Tapio Pulkkanen
3	9 Jun 2013	D+D Real Czech Challenge Open	−22 (67-69-65-65=266)	3 strokes	(England) Robert Dinwiddie, (England) Adam Gee, (England) Sam Walker

=== Alps Tour wins (2) ===
No.	Date	Tournament	Winning score	Margin of victory	Runner(s)-up
1	24 Mar 2006	Open de Mohammedia	−14 (67-69-66=202)	2 strokes	(France) Jacques Thalamy
2	1 Apr 2006	Trophée Maroc Telecom	−10 (69-67-73=209)	2 strokes	(Italy) Alessio Bruschi, (Belgium) Laurent Richard

=== French Tour wins (2) ===
No.	Date	Tournament	Winning score	Margin of victory	Runner-up
1	7 Dec 2013	AfrAsia Golf Masters	−15 (67-69-65=201)	1 stroke	(South Africa) Hennie Otto
2	12 Apr 2014	Grand Prix Schweppes	−17 (68-67-66-66=267)	1 stroke	(France) Gary Stal

== Team appearances ==
Amateur

- European Amateur Team Championship (representing France): 2005

== See also ==
- 2006 European Tour Qualifying School graduates
- 2009 Challenge Tour graduates
- 2013 Challenge Tour graduates
