= Gary Lockerbie =

English golfer (born 1982)

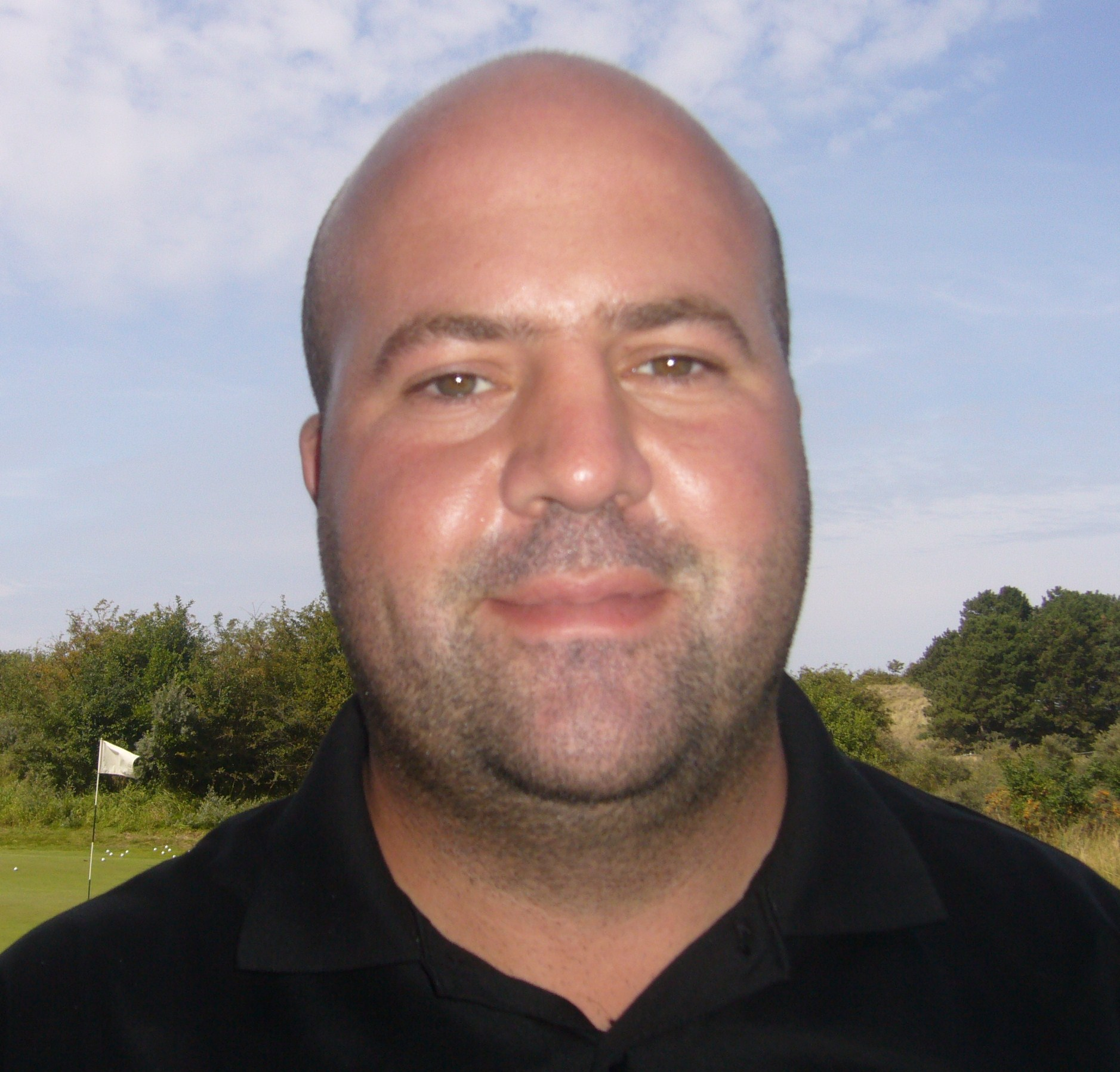

Personal information
- Nationality: England
- Born: 15 November 1982 (age 43) Penrith, Cumbria, England
- Height: 6 ft 0 in (1.83 m)
- Children: 1

Career
- Sport: Golf
- Turned professional: 2005
- Current tour: Challenge Tour
- Former tour: European Tour
- Professional wins: 1

Number of wins by tour
- Challenge Tour: 1

Best results in major championships
- Masters Tournament: DNP
- PGA Championship: DNP
- U.S. Open: DNP
- The Open Championship: CUT: 2006

Gary Lockerbie (born 15 November 1982) is an English professional golfer.

== Career ==
Lockerbie was born in Penrith, Cumbria. He had a successful amateur career, including wins in the English Amateur and the Lytham Trophy, before turning professional after representing Great Britain and Ireland in the 2005 Walker Cup.

In his first season as a professional on the second tier Challenge Tour in 2006, Lockerbie finished inside the top 15 in the rankings to graduate to the European Tour for 2007. He failed to win enough money in his rookie season on the European Tour to retain his playing status for the following year. In 2008 he claimed his first professional victory at the Kazakhstan Open, the Challenge Tour's richest regular season tournament. That win helped him to second place on the Challenge Tour Rankings and a return to the European Tour for 2009. In 2009 he finished 108th in the Race to Dubai to keep his card for the 2010 season.

== Amateur wins ==
- 2000 Carris Trophy
- 2003 English Amateur
- 2005 Lytham Trophy

== Professional wins (1) ==
=== Challenge Tour wins (1) ===
No.	Date	Tournament	Winning score	Margin of victory	Runner-up
1	21 Sep 2008	Kazakhstan Open	−15 (68-69-66-70=273)	2 strokes	(England) Stuart Davis

== Results in major championships ==
Tournament	2006
The Open Championship	CUT

Note: Lockerbie only played in The Open Championship.
CUT = missed the half-way cut

== Team appearances ==
Amateur

- European Amateur Team Championship (representing England): 2005 (winners)
- Walker Cup (representing Great Britain & Ireland): 2005

== See also ==
- 2006 Challenge Tour graduates
- 2008 Challenge Tour graduates
- 2012 Challenge Tour graduates
