= 2017 BMW PGA Championship =

Tournament information
- Dates: 25–28 May 2017
- Location: Virginia Water, Surrey, England; 51.40°N 0.59°W
- Courses: Wentworth Club; West Course
- Tour: European Tour

Statistics
- Par: 72
- Length: 7,302 yards (6,677 m)
- Field: 150 players, 66 after cut
- Cut: 146 (+2)
- Prize fund: US$7,000,000

Champion
- (Sweden) Alex Norén
- 277 (−11)

Location map
- Location in England Location in Surrey

The 2017 BMW PGA Championship was the 63rd edition of the BMW PGA Championship, an annual golf tournament on the European Tour, held 25–28 May at the West Course of Wentworth Club in Virginia Water, Surrey, England, a suburb southwest of London.

Trailing the leader by seven strokes after three rounds, Alex Norén scored a final-round 62 to win by two shots from Francesco Molinari.

== Course layout ==
Wentworth Club, West Course
Tee	Rating/Slope	1	2	3	4	5	6	7	8	9	Out	10	11	12	13	14	15	16	17	18	In	Total
Yardage	n/a	473	154	465	552	203	418	396	391	449	3,501	184	416	531	470	179	489	383	610	539	3,801	7,302
Par		4	3	4	5	3	4	4	4	4	35	3	4	5	4	3	4	4	5	5	37	72

== Round summaries ==
=== First round ===
Thursday, 25 May 2017

Place	Player	Score	To par
1	(Sweden) Johan Carlsson	66	−6
T2	(Thailand) Kiradech Aphibarnrat	67	−5
T2	(Scotland) Scott Jamieson	67	−5
T2	(Italy) Francesco Molinari	67	−5
T5	(Italy) Nino Bertasio	68	−4
T5	(Wales) Bradley Dredge	68	−4
T5	(England) Ross Fisher	68	−4
T5	(South Africa) Branden Grace	68	−4
T5	(Republic of Ireland) Shane Lowry	68	−4
T5	(Sweden) Alex Norén	68	−4
T5	(Belgium) Thomas Pieters	68	−4
T5	(Sweden) Henrik Stenson	68	−4
T5	(England) Graeme Storm	68	−4

=== Second round ===
Friday, 26 May 2017

Place	Player	Score	To par
T1	(Scotland) Scott Jamieson	67-70=137	−7
T1	(Italy) Francesco Molinari	67-70=137	−7
T1	(Belgium) Thomas Pieters	68-69=137	−7
4	(Germany) Maximilian Kieffer	70-68=138	−6
T5	(South Korea) An Byeong-hun	70-69=139	−5
T5	(Sweden) Johan Carlsson	66-73=139	−5
T5	(South Africa) Branden Grace	68-71=139	−5
T5	(Sweden) Henrik Stenson	68-71=139	−5
T5	(England) Lee Westwood	70-69=139	−5
T10	(Australia) Andrew Dodt	70-70=140	−4
T10	(England) Oliver Fisher	70-70=140	−4
T10	(England) Graeme Storm	68-72=140	−4
T10	(South Africa) Jaco van Zyl	71-69=140	−4

=== Third round ===
Saturday, 27 May 2017

Place	Player	Score	To par
1	(Australia) Andrew Dodt	70-70-68=208	−8
2	(South Africa) Branden Grace	68-71-70=209	−7
T3	(Italy) Francesco Molinari	67-70-74=211	−5
T3	(England) Lee Westwood	70-69-72=211	−5
T5	(Republic of Ireland) Shane Lowry	68-74-70=212	−4
T5	(Sweden) Henrik Stenson	68-71-73=212	−4
T5	(Japan) Hideto Tanihara	76-69-67=212	−4
T8	(Thailand) Kiradech Aphibarnrat	67-75-71=213	−3
T8	(Wales) Bradley Dredge	68-76-69=213	−3
T8	(England) Ross Fisher	68-73-72=213	−3
T8	(England) Tyrrell Hatton	69-72-72=213	−3
T8	(Scotland) Scott Jamieson	67-70-76=213	−3
T8	(England) Andrew Johnston	73-68-72=213	−3
T8	(Germany) Maximilian Kieffer	70-68-75=213	−3
T8	(England) Graeme Storm	68-72-73=213	−3

=== Final round ===
Sunday, 28 May 2017

Place	Player	Score	To par	Prize money (€)
1	(Sweden) Alex Norén	68-75-72-62=277	−11	1,041,939
2	(Italy) Francesco Molinari	67-70-74-68=279	−9	694,623
T3	(Belgium) Nicolas Colsaerts	71-75-69-65=280	−8	323,003
T3	(Sweden) Henrik Stenson	68-71-73-68=280	−8	323,003
T3	(Japan) Hideto Tanihara	76-69-67-68=280	−8	323,003
T6	(Australia) Andrew Dodt	70-70-68-73=281	−7	187,550
T6	(Republic of Ireland) Shane Lowry	68-74-70-69=281	−7	187,550
T6	(England) Graeme Storm	68-72-73-68=281	−7	187,550
T9	(South Africa) Dean Burmester	69-76-72-65=282	−6	126,700
T9	(England) Ross Fisher	68-73-72-69=282	−6	126,700
T9	(South Africa) Branden Grace	68-71-70-73=282	−6	126,700
