= Julien Forêt =

French professional golfer

Personal information
- Nationality: France
- Born: 21 August 1982 (age 44) Nouméa, New Caledonia
- Height: 1.73 m (5 ft 8 in)
- Weight: 72 kg (159 lb; 11.3 st)

Career
- Sport: Golf
- Turned professional: 2006
- Current tour: Alps Tour
- Former tours: European Tour; Challenge Tour
- Professional wins: 2

Number of wins by tour
- Challenge Tour: 1
- Other: 1

Julien Forêt (born 21 August 1982) is a French professional golfer.

== Early life ==
Forêt was born in the French colony of New Caledonia. He began playing golf at age twelve.

== Professional career ==
Forêt turned professional in 2006 at the age of 23. He began playing on the Challenge Tour, the European Tour's developmental tour, and won the Golf Open International de Toulouse. Forêt's successful start to his professional career continued when he came through 2006 European Tour Qualifying School to earn a place on the European Tour for 2007. However he then suffered a slump in form. In 2007 Forêt made only two cuts on the European Tour. He returned to the Challenge Tour for 2008 but only made four cuts. Since then he has played mainly on the third-tier Alps Tour.

== Professional wins (2) ==
=== Challenge Tour wins (1) ===
No.	Date	Tournament	Winning score	Margin of victory	Runner-up
1	8 Oct 2006	Golf Open International de Toulouse	−14 (72-67-69-66=274)	Playoff	(England) Shaun P. Webster

Challenge Tour playoff record (1–0)

No.	Year	Tournament	Opponent	Result
1	2006	Golf Open International de Toulouse	(England) Shaun P. Webster	Won with par on first extra hole

=== Alps Tour wins (1) ===
No.	Date	Tournament	Winning score	Margin of victory	Runner-up
1	17 Mar 2006	Open de Fès	−14 (63-68-71=202)	2 strokes	(France) Julien Millet

== Team appearances ==
Amateur

- Eisenhower Trophy (representing France): 2004
- European Amateur Team Championship (representing France): 2005

== See also ==
- 2006 European Tour Qualifying School graduates
