= Álvaro Quirós =

Spanish professional golfer

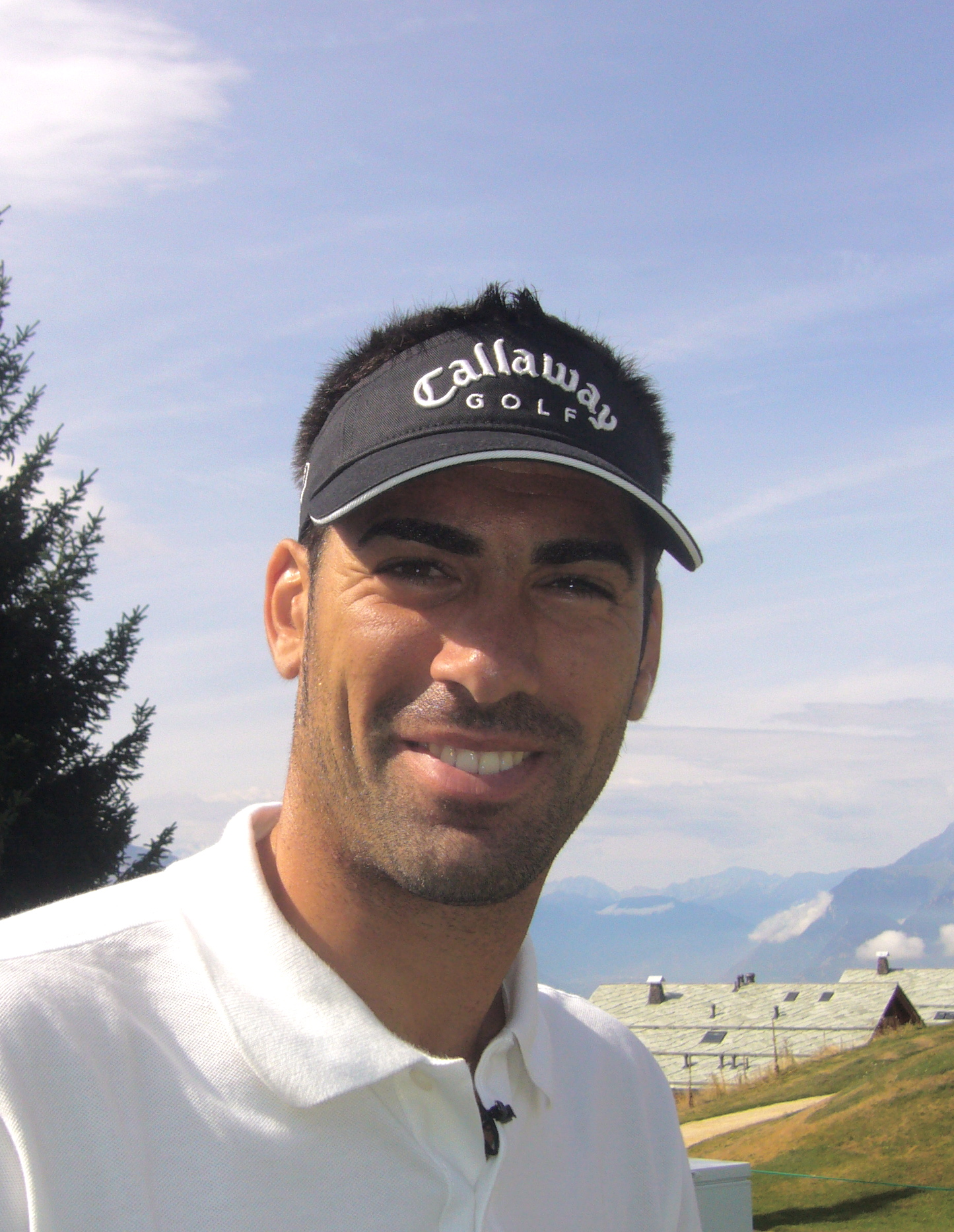

Personal information
- Full name: Álvaro Quirós García
- Nationality: Spain
- Born: 21 January 1983 (age 43) San Roque, Cádiz, Spain
- Height: 6 ft 3 in (1.91 m)

Career
- Sport: Golf
- Turned professional: 2004
- Current tour: Challenge Tour
- Former tour: European Tour
- Professional wins: 9
- Highest ranking: 21 (13 February 2011)

Number of wins by tour
- European Tour: 7
- Sunshine Tour: 1
- Challenge Tour: 1
- Other: 1

Best results in major championships
- Masters Tournament: T27: 2011
- PGA Championship: T24: 2009
- U.S. Open: T54: 2011
- The Open Championship: T11: 2010

Álvaro Quirós García (born 21 January 1983) is a Spanish professional golfer.

== Early life ==
In 1983, Quirós was born in Guadiaro, a borough of San Roque, Cádiz.

== Professional career ==
In 2004, Quirós turned professional. In 2006, he played on the Challenge Tour winning one tournament, and went on to earn his place on the European Tour for the 2007 season by finishing in the top 35 at final qualifying school. He won the first European Tour event he entered as a European Tour card-holder at the Alfred Dunhill Championship, played in South Africa.

Quirós claimed his second European Tour win at the 2008 Portugal Masters, where he finished with birdies at both 17 and 18 on Sunday, to win by three strokes over Paul Lawrie. He ended the season ranked 25th on the final Order of Merit. In January 2009, he won his third European Tour title, at the Commercialbank Qatar Masters, which moved him into the top 50 of the Official World Golf Rankings for the first time. He ended the season ranked 20th on the inaugural Race to Dubai.

Quirós is noted for his length off the tee, and was the longest driver on the European Tour in 2006, 2007 and 2008, averaging nearly 310 yards.

In May 2010, Quirós won the 2010 Open de España by one shot. He finished the season ranked 14th on the Order of Merit, his best finish to date.

Quirós continued his success in 2011. In February, Quiros won his fifth European Tour title, the Dubai Desert Classic. He defeated James Kingston and Anders Hansen by one stroke to take the title. During the final round, Quiros made a hole in one on the par-three 11th. He also won the season ending Dubai World Championship to finish the season ranked 6th on the Order of Merit. He reached a career high of 21 in the Official World Golf Ranking after each of his two European Tour wins in 2011.

Since 2011 his best performances have been third place in the 2014 Volvo China Open and tied for fourth in the 2016 Omega Dubai Desert Classic. Quirós showed a return to form by winning the 2017 Rocco Forte Open in Sicily. Quirós had a 5-shot lead after three rounds and extended this by making four birdies in the first six holes of the final round. However, he then dropped six strokes in the last 10 holes to tie with South African Zander Lombard. In the playoff Lombard made a bogey at the second hole to give Quirós his seventh European Tour win. Quirós has started the event with a world ranking of 703.

== Amateur wins ==
- 2004 Biarritz Cup (France)

== Professional wins (9) ==
=== European Tour wins (7) ===
Legend
Tour Championships (1)
Other European Tour (6)

No.	Date	Tournament	Winning score	Margin of victory	Runner(s)-up
1	10 Dec 2006 (2007 season)	Alfred Dunhill Championship^{1}	−13 (74-66-68-67=275)	1 stroke	(South Africa) Charl Schwartzel
2	19 Oct 2008	Portugal Masters	−19 (66-68-67-68=269)	3 strokes	(Scotland) Paul Lawrie
3	25 Jan 2009	Commercialbank Qatar Masters	−19 (69-67-64-69=269)	3 strokes	(South Africa) Louis Oosthuizen, (Sweden) Henrik Stenson
4	2 May 2010	Open de España	−11 (68-72-67-70=277)	Playoff	(England) James Morrison
5	13 Feb 2011	Omega Dubai Desert Classic	−11 (73-68-68-68=277)	1 stroke	(Denmark) Anders Hansen, (South Africa) James Kingston
6	11 Dec 2011	Dubai World Championship	−19 (68-64-70-67=269)	2 strokes	(Scotland) Paul Lawrie
7	21 May 2017	Rocco Forte Open	−14 (63-64-70-73=270)	Playoff	(South Africa) Zander Lombard

^{1}Co-sanctioned by the Sunshine Tour

European Tour playoff record (2–0)

No.	Year	Tournament	Opponent	Result
1	2010	Open de España	(England) James Morrison	Won with par on first extra hole
2	2017	Rocco Forte Open	(South Africa) Zander Lombard	Won with par on second extra hole

=== Challenge Tour wins (1) ===
No.	Date	Tournament	Winning score	Margin of victory	Runner-up
1	3 Jun 2006	Morson International Pro-Am Challenge	−13 (67-68-68-64=267)	4 strokes	(Wales) Mark Pilkington

=== Other wins (1) ===
- 2006 Seville Open (Spain)

== Results in major championships ==
Tournament	2009	2010	2011	2012	2013
Masters Tournament	CUT	CUT	T27	CUT	
U.S. Open	CUT	CUT	T54	CUT	
The Open Championship	CUT	T11	CUT	CUT	CUT
PGA Championship	T24	CUT	CUT	CUT	

Did not play

CUT = missed the half-way cut
"T" = tied

=== Summary ===
Tournament	Wins	2nd	3rd	Top-5	Top-10	Top-25	Events	Cuts made
Masters Tournament	0	0	0	0	0	0	4	1
U.S. Open	0	0	0	0	0	0	4	1
The Open Championship	0	0	0	0	0	1	5	1
PGA Championship	0	0	0	0	0	1	4	1
Totals	0	0	0	0	0	2	17	4

- Most consecutive cuts made – 2 (2011 Masters – 2011 U.S. Open)
- Longest streak of top-10s – 0

== Results in The Players Championship ==
Tournament	2010	2011	2012
The Players Championship	T66	T6	T40

Top 10

"T" indicates a tie for a place

== Results in World Golf Championships ==
Tournament	2009	2010	2011	2012
Match Play	R64	R64	R64	R64
Championship	T13	T6	T64	T57
Invitational	T15	T39	T53	T43
Champions	T8	T53	T49	T65

Top 10
Did not play

QF, R16, R32, R64 = Round in which player lost in match play
"T" = Tied

== Team appearances ==
Amateur

- European Boys' Team Championship (representing Spain): 2001
- European Youths' Team Championship (representing Spain): 2002, 2004
- Eisenhower Trophy (representing Spain): 2004
- European Amateur Team Championship (representing Spain): 2003 (winners)

Professional

- Seve Trophy (representing Continental Europe): 2009
- World Cup (representing Spain): 2011
- Royal Trophy (representing Europe): 2013 (winners)

== See also ==
- 2006 Challenge Tour graduates
- 2006 European Tour Qualifying School graduates
