= Alex Norén =

Swedish professional golfer (born 1982)

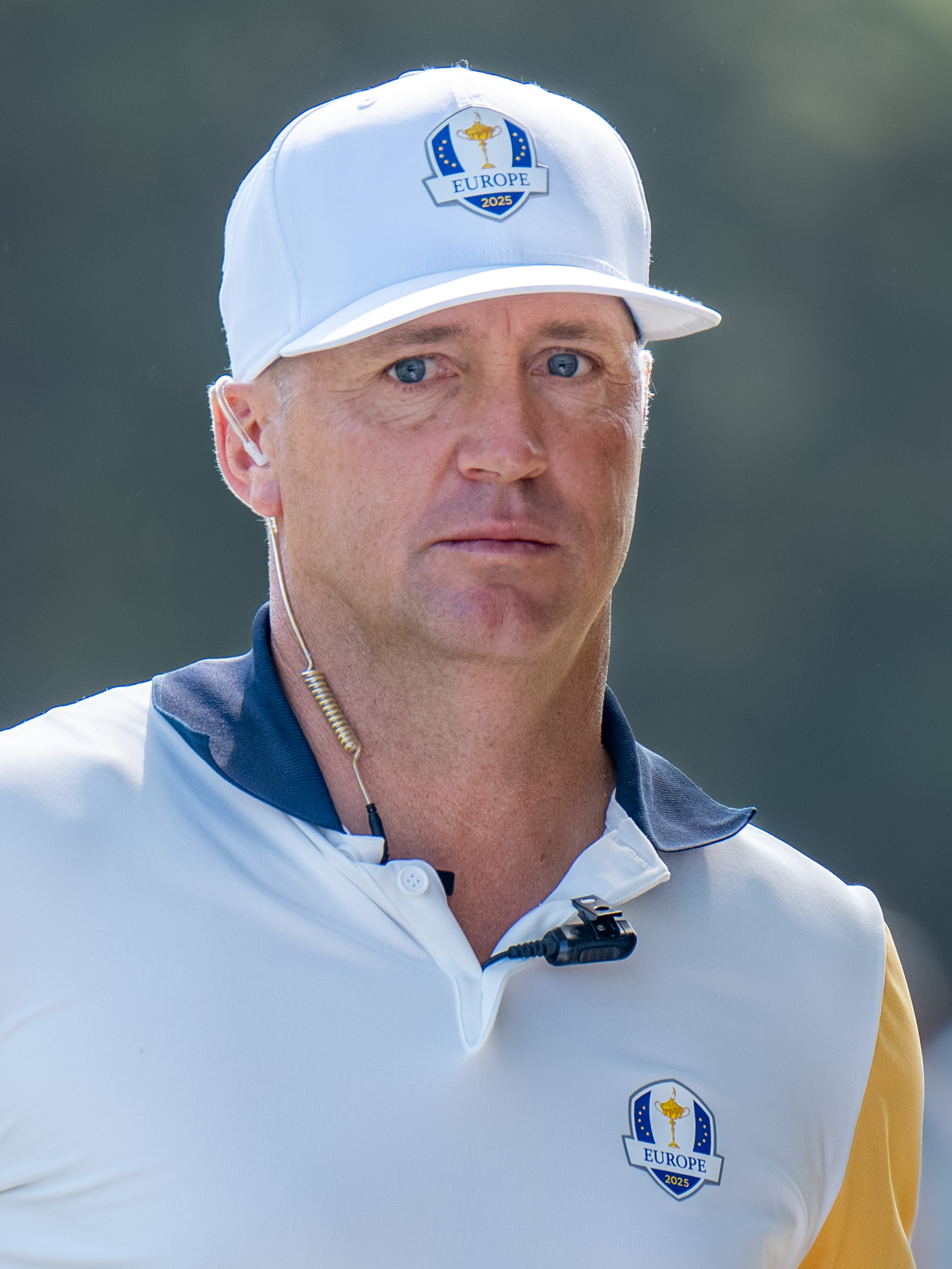
- Norén at the 2025 Ryder Cup

Personal information
- Full name: Alexander Norén
- Nationality: Sweden
- Born: 12 July 1982 (age 44) Stockholm, Sweden
- Height: 1.80 m (5 ft 11 in)
- Spouse: Jennifer Kovacs (m. 2017)
- Children: 2

Career
- Sport: Golf
- College: Oklahoma State University
- Turned professional: 2005
- Current tours: PGA Tour; European Tour
- Former tour: Challenge Tour
- Professional wins: 13
- Highest ranking: 8 (28 May 2017) (as of 15 November 2026)

Number of wins by tour
- European Tour: 12
- Asian Tour: 2
- Challenge Tour: 1

Best results in major championships
- Masters Tournament: T30: 2026
- PGA Championship: T12: 2024
- U.S. Open: T17: 2020
- The Open Championship: T6: 2017

Alexander Norén (born 12 July 1982) is a Swedish professional golfer who plays on the PGA Tour and the European Tour. He has won twelve tournaments on the European Tour, including the BMW PGA Championship, the Aberdeen Asset Management Scottish Open, the British Masters, HNA Open de France and the Nedbank Golf Challenge. He was a member of the winning 2018 European Ryder Cup team.

== Early life ==
Norén was born in Stockholm, first tried golf at 4 years of age and started playing at Haninge Golf Club. Practicing other sports too, he finally chose to give his priority to golf.

As a 14 year old, he won the unofficial Swedish Youth Championship, Föreningsbanken Cup, at his age level, scoring 146 over 36 holes at Rya Golf Club.

At 15 years of age, he attended the Swedish upper secondary sports school, to combine studying with golf training. He was also employed as junior editor at Svensk Golf, the official magazine of the Swedish Golf Federation.

== Amateur career ==
Norén represented Sweden as an amateur on all levels. He was part of the Swedish team winning the 2002 European Youths' Team Championship at Gdansk G&CC, Poland. He also represented Sweden at the 2004 Eisenhower Trophy in Río Grande, Puerto Rico, were the Swedish team finished as bronze-medalists and Norén tied 3rd individually.

He attended Oklahoma State University in the United States. Highlights include: One top-10 finish during his freshman year, concluding the season ranked No. 13 in Region V and was named to the GCAA All-Central Region team. His sophomore year included the first career top-five finish of his career, tying for third at the Inverness Intercollegiate. He finished the year being named to the Academic All-Big 12 first-team selection and was also selected as a member of the All-Central Region squad. His junior year, he posted six top-10 finishes, was a first-team All-Big 12 selection and was also an All-Central Region pick. He was part of the team that led the Oklahoma State Cowboys to a team victory at the Jerry Pate tournament.

== Professional career ==
Norén turned professional at the end of 2005 and gained a place on Europe's second tier Challenge Tour by reaching the final stage of the European Tour qualifying school. In his rookie season he claimed his maiden professional victory at the Rolex Trophy, and ended the year in 3rd place on the Challenge Tour Rankings to graduate to the elite European Tour for 2007.

Norén had a solid rookie season on the European Tour in 2007 and improved on that the following year to finish in 31st place on the Order of Merit. He made the cut at the 2008 Open Championship and was in the top 10 going into day 3, before eventually finishing in a tie for 19th place.

Norén won his first title on the European Tour in September 2009 at the Omega European Masters, where he finished 20 under par to win by two strokes over Bradley Dredge. Norén finished the season ranked 25th on the Race To Dubai.

=== 2011–2014 ===
In June 2011, Norén won his second European Tour title at the Saab Wales Open played at The Celtic Manor Resort. He won by two strokes from Grégory Bourdy and Anders Hansen finishing at 9 under par. This victory secured him of a place in the WGC-Bridgestone Invitational at Firestone Country Club in August. The following month, Norén won his third European Tour title at the Nordea Masters at Bro Hof Slott Golf Club in his home country of Sweden. He won from wire-to-wire, the first time in his career he had achieved this feat, and opened up an eleven-stroke margin after the third round. Despite difficult conditions in the wind on the final day, Norén finished seven strokes ahead of Richard Finch. He finished the season ranked 14th on the Race to Dubai.

After two positive seasons in 2012 and 2013, where he registered third places at the Aberdeen Asset Management Scottish Open and the Alfred Dunhill Links Championship, Norén missed most of 2014 with tendonitis in both wrists.

=== 2015–2016 ===
Norén came back to competitions in January 2015; in June he won his fourth European Tour title by capturing the Nordea Masters in Sweden for the second time in his career. He won by four strokes from Søren Kjeldsen, having held a two-stroke lead after 54 holes.

In the second half of 2016 Norén would hit outstanding form, winning four in eleven starts on the European Tour. In July he won the Aberdeen Asset Management Scottish Open at Castle Stuart, the event before The Open Championship, for his fifth European Tour victory. He won by a single stroke from the Englishman Tyrrell Hatton. This win continued his trend of holding the 54-hole lead in every event that he had won on tour. It also represented the first time that Norén had won in back-to-back seasons.

After finishing runner-up at the Paul Lawrie Matchplay in August, he won the Omega European Masters in September, beating Scott Hend at the first playoff hole. A month later, he captured his third win of the season at the British Masters at The Grove. The win lifted him to the 18th place on the Official World Golf Ranking.

In November, Norén won his fourth title of 2016 at the Nedbank Golf Challenge, capturing $1,166,660, the largest in his career so far. He began the final day six shots behind Wang Jeung-hun only to finish six strokes ahead after a record round of 63 (−9). With the win, he moved to third in the Race to Dubai ranking, and to ninth in the Official World Golf Ranking, becoming only the fourth Swede to enter the top ten of the OWGR after Henrik Stenson, Robert Karlsson and Jesper Parnevik.

In March 2017, Norén was awarded 2016 Best Athlete in Stockholm by the Stockholm Sports Federation and the Stockholm Sport Journalists Club.

=== 2017–2018 ===
In May 2017, Norén won the BMW PGA Championship on the European Tour.

Norén qualified for the PGA Tour for the 2017–18 season through non-member FedEx Cup points. In January 2018, Norén finished runner-up at the Farmers Insurance Open after entering the final round with a one stroke lead. Norén lost to Jason Day on the sixth extra hole of a sudden-death playoff. The players had to come back for a Monday finish, after the first five holes could not separate them. Norén then lost to birdie on the sixth extra hole, after his second shot found the water.

In March 2018, Norén had another notable week, when he finished 3rd place in the WGC-Match Play. He progressed all the way through to the semi-finals, where he faced Kevin Kisner. It was a tight match all the way through, with no player more than 1 up. Norén had a putt to win the match on the 18th hole, but it slid by. He would eventually lose in 19 holes, after a misread putt from off the green cost him a bogey. He then beat Justin Thomas, 5 & 3, in the consolation match.

In July 2018, Norén won the HNA Open de France on the European Tour. This event was held at Le Golf National outside of Paris, France.

In September 2018, Norén qualified for the European team participating in the 2018 Ryder Cup. Europe defeated the U.S. team 17 1/2 to 10 1/2. Coincidentally, the event was also held at Le Golf National. Noren went 2–1–0 and won his singles match against Bryson DeChambeau, playing in the last game on Sunday. Norén secured his win when he holed a long birdie putt on the 18th hole, the very last shot of the whole event, stating the final result and causing the European team to celebrate on the 18th green.

=== 2019–2022 ===
Norén could not maintain his good form through 2019 and fell in the Official World Golf Ranking from 19th at the end of 2018 to 75th a year later. His best 2019 finish on the European Tour as well as on the PGA Tour was tied 11th at the 148th Open Championship at Royal Portrush Golf Club, Northern Ireland.

On 26 July 2020, Norén had his best PGA Tour finish in over two years, when he tied 3rd at the 3M Open in Blaine, Minnesota, with a 268, (−16) score, three shots behind winner Michael Thompson.

At the 120th U.S. Open on 17−20 September 2020 at Winged Foot Golf Club, New York, Norén made the cut at 6 over par with no margin. In the third round, under tough conditions, he shot a 3-under 67, the second lowest round of the day, advancing to 11th place. He finished the tournament a career best tied 17th at 8 over par, 14 strokes behind winner Bryson DeChambeau, but only six strokes from third place.

At the 2021 Rocket Mortgage Classic at Detroit Golf Club, Detroit, Michigan, on July 4, Norén shot an 8-under-par score of 64 in the fourth round, to finish tied fourth, one shot from reaching a playoff for the win. By this achievement, he advanced to 83rd on the Official World Golf Ranking, his best ranking since January 2020.

In July 2022, Norén was the first alternate at the 150th Open Championship, having been onsite until Tuesday, he decided to fly to California to play in the Barracuda Championship. He went on to finish solo-second; finishing one point behind Chez Reavie.

In November 2022, Norén finished tied second at the DP World Tour Championship in Dubai, advancing to 41st on the Official World Golf Ranking and giving him an opportunity to stay inside the top 50 on the world rankings at the end of the year and to receive an invitation to the 2023 Masters Tournament.

=== 2025–2026 ===
Norén didn't begin the 2025 season until May at the PGA Championship. He started the final round three shots behind leader, Scottie Scheffler, ultimately finishing in a tie for 17th place.

In August, Norén won the Betfred British Masters at The Belfry, for the second time in his career. The following week, he was announced as the final European vice captain for the Ryder Cup at Bethpage Black. Three weeks after his British Masters win, Norén won the BMW PGA Championship at Wentworth, defeating Adrien Saddier on the first hole of a playoff, also moving to 18th in the Official World Golf Ranking. In December he lost a playoff to Hideki Matsuyama at the Hero World Challenge, and moved up to 12th in the OWGR.

On the 2026 PGA Tour, Norén finished 46th in the regular season rankings to qualify for the 2026 FedEx Cup Playoffs, where he tied for 3rd at the FedEx St. Jude Championship.

== Awards, honors ==
In 2009, he received Elit Sign number 136 by the Swedish Golf Federation based on world ranking achievements.

In 2011, he was awarded honorary member of the PGA of Sweden.

== Professional wins (13) ==
=== European Tour wins (12) ===
Legend
Flagship events (1)
Race to Dubai finals series (1)
Rolex Series (3) (Note: The 2017 BMW PGA Championship was also a Rolex Series tournament.)
Other European Tour (8)

No.	Date	Tournament	Winning score	Margin of victory	Runner(s)-up
1	6 Sep 2009	Omega European Masters^{1}	−20 (65-70-63-66=264)	2 strokes	(Wales) Bradley Dredge
2	5 Jun 2011	Saab Wales Open	−9 (67-67-71-70=275)	2 strokes	(France) Grégory Bourdy, (Denmark) Anders Hansen
3	24 Jul 2011	Nordea Masters	−15 (67-66-63-77=273)	7 strokes	(England) Richard Finch
4	7 Jun 2015	Nordea Masters (2)	−12 (70-68-67-71=276)	4 strokes	(Denmark) Søren Kjeldsen
5	10 Jul 2016	Aberdeen Asset Management Scottish Open	−14 (70-66-68-70=274)	1 stroke	(England) Tyrrell Hatton
6	4 Sep 2016	Omega European Masters^{1} (2)	−17 (69-63-66-65=263)	Playoff	(Australia) Scott Hend
7	16 Oct 2016	British Masters	−18 (67-65-65-69=266)	2 strokes	(Austria) Bernd Wiesberger
8	13 Nov 2016	Nedbank Golf Challenge	−14 (69-67-75-63=274)	6 strokes	(South Korea) Wang Jeung-hun
9	28 May 2017	BMW PGA Championship	−11 (68-75-72-62=277)	2 strokes	(Italy) Francesco Molinari
10	1 Jul 2018	HNA Open de France	−7 (73-72-65-67=277)	1 stroke	(Scotland) Russell Knox, (United States) Julian Suri, (England) Chris Wood
11	24 Aug 2025	Betfred British Masters (2)	−16 (68-72-65-67=272)	1 stroke	(Denmark) Nicolai Højgaard, (New Zealand) Kazuma Kobori
12	14 Sep 2025	BMW PGA Championship (2)	−19 (67-68-66-68=269)	Playoff	(France) Adrien Saddier

^{1}Co-sanctioned by the Asian Tour

European Tour playoff record (2–0)

No.	Year	Tournament	Opponent	Result
1	2016	Omega European Masters	(Australia) Scott Hend	Won with birdie on first extra hole
2	2025	BMW PGA Championship	(France) Adrien Saddier	Won with birdie on first extra hole

=== Challenge Tour wins (1) ===
No.	Date	Tournament	Winning score	Margin of victory	Runners-up
1	20 Aug 2006	Rolex Trophy	−22 (66-67-62-71=266)	3 strokes	(Sweden) Johan Axgren, (England) Gareth Davies

Challenge Tour playoff record (0–1)

No.	Year	Tournament	Opponent	Result
1	2006	Kai Fieberg Costa Rica Open	(Sweden) Johan Axgren	Lost to birdie on third extra hole

== Playoff record ==
PGA Tour playoff record (0–1)

No.	Year	Tournament	Opponents	Result
1	2018	Farmers Insurance Open	(Australia) Jason Day, (United States) Ryan Palmer	Day won with birdie on sixth extra hole Palmer eliminated by birdie on first hole

Other playoff record (0–1)

No.	Year	Tournament	Opponent	Result
1	2025	Hero World Challenge	(Japan) Hideki Matsuyama	Lost to birdie on first extra hole

== Results in major championships ==
Results not in chronological order in 2020.

Tournament	2008	2009	2010	2011	2012	2013	2014	2015	2016	2017	2018
Masters Tournament										CUT	CUT
U.S. Open				T51	CUT			CUT	CUT	CUT	T25
The Open Championship	T19		CUT	CUT	T9	WD			T46	T6	T17
PGA Championship				T34	T66	CUT			T49	T67	CUT

Tournament	2019	2020	2021	2022	2023	2024	2025	2026
Masters Tournament	T62				CUT			T30
PGA Championship	T54	T22	T55	CUT	CUT	T12	T17	T26
U.S. Open	CUT	T17		CUT	CUT	CUT		CUT
The Open Championship	T11	NT	CUT		T23	T13		T18

Top 10
Did not play

CUT = missed the half-way cut
WD = withdrew
"T" = tied
NT = no tournament due to COVID-19 pandemic

=== Summary ===
Tournament	Wins	2nd	3rd	Top-5	Top-10	Top-25	Events	Cuts made
Masters Tournament	0	0	0	0	0	0	5	2
PGA Championship	0	0	0	0	0	3	14	10
U.S. Open	0	0	0	0	0	2	12	3
The Open Championship	0	0	0	0	2	8	13	9
Totals	0	0	0	0	2	13	44	24

- Most consecutive cuts made – 4 (twice)
- Longest streak of top-10s – 1 (twice)

== Results in The Players Championship ==
Tournament	2017	2018	2019	2020	2021	2022	2023	2024	2025	2026
The Players Championship	10	T17	CUT	C	CUT	T26	CUT	T19		T32

Top 10

CUT = missed the halfway cut
"T" indicates a tie for a place
C = cancelled after the first round due to the COVID-19 pandemic

== Results in World Golf Championships ==
Results not in chronological order prior to 2015.

Tournament	2009	2010	2011	2012	2013	2014	2015	2016	2017	2018	2019	2020	2021	2022	2023
Championship				69	T20		T56		T55	T14	T62				
Match Play		R64			R32				QF	3	T17	NT^{1}		T18	T52
Invitational		T53	T53						T28	T31	T12				
Champions	T19		T49				T54	T12	T31	T18		NT^{1}	NT^{1}	NT^{1}	

^{1}Cancelled due to COVID-19 pandemic

Top 10
Did not play

QF, R16, R32, R64 = Round in which player lost in match play
NT = No tournament
"T" = tied
Note that the Championship and Invitational were discontinued from 2022. The Champions was discontinued from 2023.

== Team appearances ==
Amateur

- European Boys' Team Championship (representing Sweden): 1998, 1999, 2000
- Jacques Léglise Trophy (representing the Continent of Europe): 2000
- European Youths' Team Championship (representing Sweden): 2002 (winners)
- European Amateur Team Championship (representing Sweden): 2003, 2005
- Eisenhower Trophy (representing Sweden): 2004
- Palmer Cup (representing Europe): 2004 (winners), 2005

Professional

- Royal Trophy (representing Europe): 2010 (winners)
- Seve Trophy (representing Continental Europe): 2011
- World Cup (representing Sweden): 2011, 2016
- EurAsia Cup (representing Europe): 2018 (winners)
- Ryder Cup (representing Europe): 2018 (winners)
- Hero Cup (representing Continental Europe): 2023 (winners)

== See also ==
- List of golfers with most European Tour wins
- 2006 Challenge Tour graduates
- 2025 Race to Dubai dual card winners
