= Benn Barham =

English professional golfer

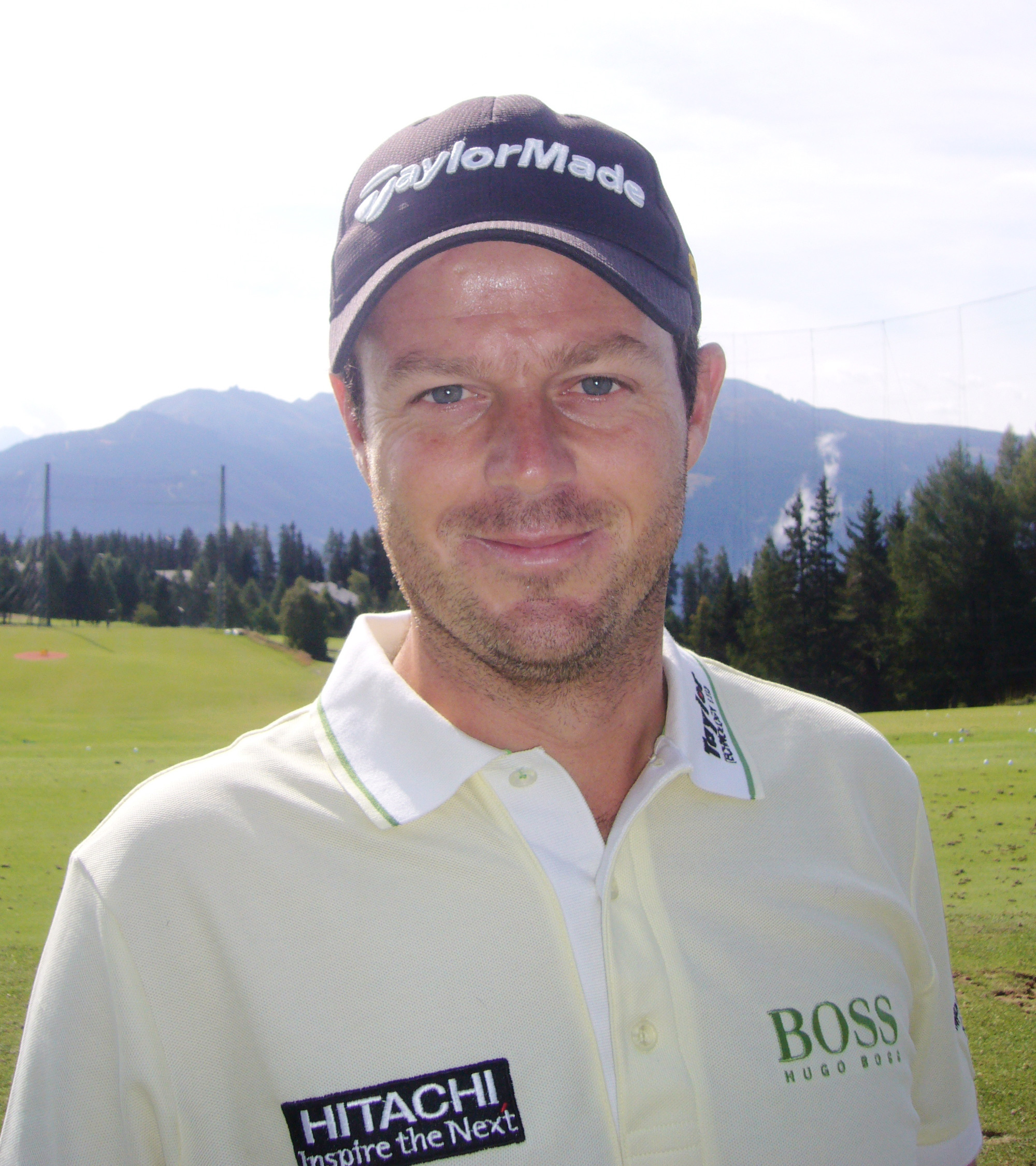

Personal information
- Full name: Benn James John Barham
- Nationality: England
- Born: 6 February 1976 (age 50) Ashford, Kent, England
- Height: 5 ft 9 in (1.75 m)

Career
- Sport: Golf
- Turned professional: 1996
- Former tours: European Tour; Challenge Tour
- Professional wins: 2

Number of wins by tour
- Challenge Tour: 2

Best results in major championships
- Masters Tournament: DNP
- PGA Championship: DNP
- U.S. Open: DNP
- The Open Championship: CUT: 2002, 2007

Benn James John Barham (born 6 February 1976) is an English professional golfer on the European Tour.

== Early life ==
Barham was born in Ashford, Kent.

== Professional career ==
Barham has won two tournaments on the second tier Challenge Tour, the 2001 NCC Open and the 2005 Open Mahou de Madrid. Since graduating from the Challenge Tour at the end of 2005, he has managed to retain his European Tour card each season by finishing inside the top 120 on the Order of Merit, and through the end of 2009, had a best tournament finish on the tour of second place at the 2009 Austrian Golf Open. Despite that result he lost his card at the end of 2009, and spent 2010 playing on both the European and Challenge Tours. In October 2010 Barham had his right kidney removed after a cancerous tumour was diagnosed; he returned to competitive golf at the Kenya Open in April 2011.

In recent seasons Barham has begun an initiative in which he donates £1 for every birdie he makes to Demelza House, a children's hospice in Kent.

== Professional wins (2) ==
=== Challenge Tour wins (2) ===
No.	Date	Tournament	Winning score	Margin of victory	Runner-up
1	3 Jun 2001	NCC Open	−11 (71-67-63-72=273)	2 strokes	(England) Paul Dwyer
2	3 Jul 2005	Open Mahou de Madrid	−21 (63-67-66-67=263)	4 strokes	(Sweden) Fredrik Widmark

== Team appearances ==
- PGA Cup (representing Great Britain and Ireland): 2013 (tie)

== See also ==
- 2005 Challenge Tour graduates
