= Marcus Higley =

English golfer (born 1974)

Personal information
- Nationality: England
- Born: 16 May 1974 (age 52) Yeovil, England
- Height: 1.78 m (5 ft 10 in)
- Weight: 147 lb (67 kg; 10.5 st)

Career
- Sport: Golf
- Turned professional: 1991
- Former tours: European Tour; Challenge Tour
- Professional wins: 1

Number of wins by tour
- Challenge Tour: 1

Marcus Higley (born 16 May 1974) is an English professional golfer. He previously played on the European Tour and the Challenge Tour.

== Career ==
Higley turned professional at the young age of 17. He qualified to the Challenge Tour in 2001 and enjoyed a breakthrough year in 2006, recording his first win at the Thomas Bjørn Open and earning a European Tour card for the first time. In his debut season at the highest level, he recorded several top-10 finishes, including a runner-up finish at the dual-sanctioned Open de Saint-Omer. He regained his European Tour card at the first attempt via the 2008 Challenge Tour, but endured a tough season on the full tour due to injury. Despite surgery, in 2012 he retired from the professional golf circuit.

== Professional wins (1) ==
=== Challenge Tour wins (1) ===
No.	Date	Tournament	Winning score	Margin of victory	Runners-up
1	11 Jun 2006	Thomas Bjørn Open	−11 (69-68-73-67=277)	2 strokes	(South Africa) Michiel Bothma, (Italy) Alessio Bruschi, (Wales) Gareth Davies, (England) Denny Lucas

== See also ==
- 2006 Challenge Tour graduates
- 2008 Challenge Tour graduates
