= Stuart Davis (golfer) =

English golfer (born 1973)

Personal information
- Nationality: England
- Born: 24 August 1973 (age 53) Heanor, England
- Height: 1.75 m (5 ft 9 in)
- Weight: 168 lb (76 kg; 12.0 st)

Career
- Sport: Golf
- Turned professional: 2001
- Former tours: European Tour; Challenge Tour

Stuart Davis (born 24 August 1973) is an English professional golfer.

== Career ==
In 2001, at the advanced age of 28, Davis turned professional. He soon earned a place on the second-tier Challenge Tour, where he played for several years with some success, including three runner-up finishes. In 2008, he was runner-up at the Kazakhstan Open; this ultimately earned Davis a place on the European Tour for 2009 as he took the 20th and final place in the standings, thanks to a missed putt by rival Marco Ruiz. However, his debut season was unsuccessful and he returned to the lower tier.

== Playoff record ==
Challenge Tour playoff record (0–1)

No.	Year	Tournament	Opponent	Result
1	2005	Skandia PGA Open	(Scotland) David Patrick	Lost to par on third extra hole

== See also ==
- 2008 Challenge Tour graduates
