= 2006 Challenge Tour =

Golf tour season

2005 Challenge Tour season
- Duration: 1 December 2005 – 22 October 2006
- Number of official events: 31
- Most wins: (Sweden) Johan Axgren (2) (Germany) Martin Kaymer (2) (France) Adrien Mörk (2)
- Rankings: (Wales) Mark Pilkington

The 2006 Challenge Tour was the 18th season of the Challenge Tour, the official development tour to the European Tour.

== OWGR points increase ==
In July 2005, the Official World Golf Ranking announced that the minimum points awarded to Challenge Tour events, beginning in 2006, would be increased from 6 to 12.

== Schedule ==
The following table lists official events during the 2006 season.

Date	Tournament	Host country	Purse (€)	Winner (Note: The number in brackets after each winner's name is the number of Challenge Tour events they had won up to and including that tournament. This information is only shown for Challenge Tour members. It is rare for someone to accumulate many wins on the Challenge Tour as success at this level usually leads to promotion to the European Tour.)	OWGR points	Other tours (Note: EUR − European Tour; NGL − Nordic Golf League; TLA − Tour de las Américas.)	Notes
4 Dec	Abierto Mexicano Corona	Mexico	US$305,000	(Mexico) Antonio Maldonado (1)	6	TLA	
11 Dec	Abierto Visa de la República	Argentina	US$250,000	(United States) Kevin Stadler (n/a)	12	TLA	New to Challenge Tour
5 Feb	Abierto Movistar Guatemala Open	Guatemala	US$150,000	(Argentina) Miguel Ángel Carballo (1)	12	TLA	
12 Feb	Kai Fieberg Costa Rica Open	Costa Rica	US$125,000	(Sweden) Johan Axgren (2)	12	TLA	
26 Feb	Estoril Challenge	Portugal	120,000	(Wales) Kyron Sullivan (1)	12		
12 Mar	Tusker Kenya Open	Kenya	160,000	(Sweden) Johan Axgren (3)	12		
9 Apr	Peugeot Challenge R.C.G. El Prat	Spain	120,000	(Scotland) David Drysdale (2)	12		
30 Apr	Tessali-Metaponto Open di Puglia e Basilicata	Italy	120,000	(France) Anthony Snobeck (1)	12		
14 May	Parco di Monza Challenge	Italy	130,000	(Spain) Álvaro Salto (3)	12		New tournament
21 May	Telenet Trophy	Belgium	130,000	(Finland) Toni Karjalainen (2)	12		New tournament
28 May	Tikida Hotels Agadir Moroccan Classic	Morocco	130,000	(France) Adrien Mörk (1)	12		
3 Jun	Morson International Pro-Am Challenge	England	£100,000	(Spain) Álvaro Quirós (1)	12		
11 Jun	Thomas Bjørn Open	Denmark	120,000	(England) Marcus Higley (1)	12		
18 Jun	Aa St Omer Open	France	400,000	(Argentina) César Monasterio (2)	18	EUR	
18 Jun	Lexus Open	Norway	120,000	(Sweden) Kalle Brink (3)	12		
25 Jun	Credit Suisse Challenge	Switzerland	140,000	(Spain) Francisco Cea (2)	12		
2 Jul	Open Mahou de Madrid	Spain	120,000	(Spain) Juan Parrón (1)	12		
9 Jul	Scottish Challenge	Scotland	200,000	(England) Sam Walker (1)	12		New tournament
16 Jul	Texbond Open	Italy	120,000	(Spain) Carlos del Moral (1)	12		
23 Jul	MAN NÖ Open	Austria	130,000	(Spain) Rafa Cabrera-Bello (1)	12		New to Challenge Tour
30 Jul	Ryder Cup Wales Challenge	Wales	130,000	(Wales) Sion Bebb (1)	12		
6 Aug	Ireland Ryder Cup Challenge	Ireland	130,000	(Australia) John Wade (1)	12		
13 Aug	Vodafone Challenge	Germany	120,000	(Germany) Martin Kaymer (1)	12		New tournament
20 Aug	Rolex Trophy	Switzerland	200,000	(Sweden) Alex Norén (1)	12		
27 Aug	ECCO Tour Championship	Denmark	130,000	(England) James Heath (1)	12	NGL	New tournament
3 Sep	Telia Challenge Waxholm	Sweden	SKr 1,130,000	(Argentina) Rafael Echenique (1)	12		
17 Sep	Open des Volcans – Challenge de France	France	120,000	(Germany) Martin Kaymer (2)	12		
24 Sep	OKI Mahou Challenge de España	Spain	130,000	(France) Adrien Mörk (2)	12		
1 Oct	Kazakhstan Open	Kazakhstan	300,000	(Wales) Mark Pilkington (1)	12		
8 Oct	Golf Open International de Toulouse	France	120,000	(France) Julien Forêt (1)	12		
22 Oct	Apulia San Domenico Grand Final	Italy	250,000	(England) James Hepworth (2)	12		Tour Championship

== Rankings ==
The rankings were based on prize money won during the season, calculated in Euros. The top 20 players on the rankings earned status to play on the 2007 European Tour.

Rank	Player	Prize money (€)
1	(Wales) Mark Pilkington	119,152
2	(Sweden) Johan Axgren	105,699
3	(Sweden) Alex Norén	99,631
4	(Germany) Martin Kaymer	93,321
5	(England) James Hepworth	84,236
