= Johan Axgren =

Swedish professional golfer

Personal information
- Full name: Bengt Johan Axgren
- Nationality: Sweden
- Born: 5 March 1975 (age 51) Gothenburg, Sweden
- Height: 1.87 m (6 ft 2 in)
- Weight: 90 kg (198 lb; 14 st 2 lb)
- Life partner: Sofia
- Children: 1

Career
- Sport: Golf
- Turned professional: 1995
- Former tours: European Tour; Challenge Tour; Swedish Golf Tour
- Professional wins: 6

Number of wins by tour
- Challenge Tour: 3
- Other: 3

Bengt Johan Axgren (born 5 March 1975) is a Swedish professional golfer.

== Early life ==
Axgren was born in Gothenburg.

== Professional career ==
In 1995, Axgren turned professional. Axgren has won four times on the Challenge Tour, the first in 1996, and then once in 2004, and twice more in 2006, when he finished second on the end of season money list, to graduate to the European Tour for the 2007 season. He did not win sufficient money during that season to retain his tour card, and returned to the Challenge Tour the following season.

On 7 May 2006, Axgren achieved a career highest world ranking of 189.

== Professional wins (6) ==
=== Challenge Tour wins (3) ===
No.	Date	Tournament	Winning score	Margin of victory	Runner(s)-up
1	11 Jun 2004	Open des Volcans – Challenge de France	−4 (75-67-67-71=280)	1 stroke	(England) Richard Bland
2	12 Feb 2006	Kai Fieberg Costa Rica Open^{1}	−7 (74-67-69-67=277)	Playoff	(Sweden) Alex Norén
3	12 Mar 2006	Tusker Kenya Open	−10 (64-69-67-70=270)	4 strokes	(England) James Hepworth, (England) Gary Lockerbie

^{1}Co-sanctioned by the Tour de las Américas

Challenge Tour playoff record (1–1)

No.	Year	Tournament	Opponent(s)	Result
1	2004	Volvo Finnish Open	(England) Phillip Archer, (Finland) Roope Kakko (a)	Kakko won with birdie on first extra hole
2	2006	Kai Fieberg Costa Rica Open	(Sweden) Alex Norén	Won with birdie on third extra hole

=== Swedish Golf Tour wins (2) ===
No.	Date	Tournament	Winning score	Margin of victory	Runner(s)-up
1	16 Jun 1996	Västerås Open	−7 (66-67-67=200)	3 strokes	(Sweden) Markus Rosenlund
2	10 Oct 2003	Telia Tourkval Kävlinge	−10 (65-71-70=206)	9 strokes	(Sweden) Jesper Björklund, (Denmark) Jeppe Huldahl

=== Other wins (1) ===
- 2001 Lear Open Silfverschiöldspokalen (Swedish mini-tour)

== See also ==
- 2006 Challenge Tour graduates
