= 2010 Tour de las Américas =

Golf tour season

2010 Tour de las Américas season
- Duration: 18 February 2010 – 12 December 2010
- Number of official events: 15
- Most wins: (Argentina) Julián Etulain (2) (Argentina) Sebastián Fernández (2) (Argentina) Andrés Romero (2)
- Order of Merit: (Argentina) Julián Etulain

The 2010 Tour de las Américas was the 19th season of the Tour de las Américas (formerly the South American Tour), the main professional golf tour in Latin America since it was formed in 1991.

== Schedule ==
The following table lists official events during the 2010 season.

Date	Tournament	Host country	Purse (US$)	Winner (Note: The number in brackets after each winner's name is the number of Tour de las Américas events they had won up to and including that tournament.)	OWGR points	Other tours (Note: CAN − Canadian Tour; CHA − Challenge Tour; TPG − TPG Tour.)
21 Feb	Abierto Internacional de Golf Copa Antioquia	Colombia	220,000	(Colombia) David Vanegas (1)	12	CAN, CHA
18 Feb	Abierto del Centro	Argentina	Arg$240,000	(Argentina) Andrés Romero (6)	n/a	TPG
9 May	Televisa TLA Players Championship	Mexico	70,000	(Argentina) Luciano Dodda (1)	n/a	
30 May	Toyota Peru Open	Peru	80,000	(Argentina) Sebastián Fernández (3)	n/a	
5 Jul	Abierto Internacional Eje Cafetero	Colombia	Col$70,000,000	(Colombia) Óscar David Álvarez (2)	n/a	
18 Jul	Abierto Internacional de Golf Copa Sura	Colombia	Col$100,000,000	(Colombia) Jesús Amaya (7)	n/a	
1 Aug	Abierto de Colombia	Colombia	Col$320,000,000	(Argentina) Julián Etulain (1)	n/a	
10 Oct	YPF Classic	Argentina	Arg$138,000	(Argentina) Mauricio Molina (2)	n/a	TPG
11 Oct	Sports Francés Open	Chile	40,000	(Colombia) José Manuel Garrido (2)	n/a	
17 Oct	Abierto Internacional de Golf Hacienda Chicureo	Chile	35,000	(Argentina) Julián Etulain (2)	n/a	
24 Oct	Abierto de Chile	Chile	40,000	(Argentina) Gustavo Acosta (1)	n/a	
31 Oct	Carlos Franco Invitational	Paraguay	Arg$138,000	(Argentina) Sebastián Fernández (4)	n/a	TPG
28 Nov	Roberto De Vicenzo Classic	Argentina	35,000	(Argentina) Daniel Barbetti (3)	n/a	TPG
5 Dec	Torneo de Maestros	Argentina	Arg$360,000	(Argentina) Andrés Romero (7)	n/a	TPG
12 Dec	Abierto Visa de la República	Argentina	100,000	(Venezuela) Jhonattan Vegas (1)	n/a	TPG

== Order of Merit ==
The Order of Merit was based on tournament results during the season, calculated using a points-based system.

Position	Player	Points
1	(Argentina) Julián Etulain	56,593
2	(Colombia) David Vanegas	51,121
3	(Argentina) Sebastián Fernández	34,243
4	(Colombia) José Manuel Garrido	32,517
5	(Argentina) Paulo Pinto	27,286
