= Rio Cuarto Open =

Golf tournament in Argentina

The Rio Cuarto Open or Abierto de Rio Cuarto was a golf tournament on the PGA of Argentina Tour, formerly the principal professional golf tour in Argentina. Founded in 1956, it was always played at the Rio Cuarto Golf Club in Río Cuarto, Córdoba Province. It was last held in 2000.

== Winners ==
Year	Winner	Score	Runner-up	Amateur winner
2000	Daniel Vancsik	282	Armando Saavedra, Rubén Alvarez, Sebastián Fernández	Clodomiro Carranza
1999	No tournament			
1998	Gustavo Acosta	201	Gustavo Rojas	Juan I. Gil
1997	Roberto Coceres	210	Mauricio Molina, Gonzalo Orfila	Juan I. Gil
1992–96	No tournament			
1991	Ángel Franco	277	Fabian Montovia	Juan Cruz Molina
1986–90	No tournament			
1985	Luis Carbonetti	213	Antonio Ortiz	
1984	No tournament			
1983	Jorge Soto	273	Luis Carbonetti (amateur)	Luis Carbonetti
1982	Jorge Soto*	278	Florentino Molina	Luis Carbonetti
1979–81	No tournament			
1978	Florentino Molina	278	Jorge Soto, Horacio Carbonetti	Luis Daneri
1977	Florentino Molina	137	Fidel de Luca, Ruben Terrier	Luis Carbonetti
1976	No tournament			
1975	Vicente Fernández	282	Jorge Soto	Roberto Monguzzi
1968–74	No tournament			
1967	Rodolfo Sereda	282	Domingo Pascualucci	Horacio Carbonetti
1966	Leopoldo Ruiz	137	Florentino Molina	Raul Travieso
1965	Roberto De Vicenzo	283	Orlando Tudino	Raul Travieso
1964	Leopoldo Ruiz	282	Elcido Nari	Angel Monguzzi
1963	Juan Querelos	281	Juan Das Neves	Valerio Gerbaudo
1962	Elcido Nari	278	Luis Rapisarda	Carlos Brachts
1961	Juan Das Neves*	288	Romualdo Barbieri	Raul Travieso
1960	Juan Das Neves	273	Juan Anzaldo	Golfredo Gonzalez
1959	Fidel de Luca	280	Juan Anzaldo	Valerio Gerbaudo
1958	Juan Das Neves*	280	Carlos Anzaldo	Hugo Nicora
1957	Antonio Cerdá	275	Juan Das Neves	Hugo Nicora
1956	Antonio Cerdá	278	Juan Querelos	Hugo Nicora

* won following playoff
