= 2010 TPG Tour =

Golf tour season

2010 TPG Tour season
- Duration: 15 April 2010 – 16 January 2011
- Number of official events: 11
- Most wins: (Argentina) Rafael Gómez (2) (Argentina) Andrés Romero (2)
- Order of Merit: (Argentina) Andrés Romero

The 2010 TPG Tour was the fourth season of the TPG Tour, the main professional golf tour in Argentina since it was formed in 2007.

== Schedule ==
The following table lists official events during the 2010 season.

Date	Tournament	Location	Purse (Arg$)	Winner (Note: The number in brackets after each winner's name is the number of TPG Tour events they had won up to and including that tournament.)	Other tours (Note: TLA − Tour de las Américas.)
26 Feb	Abierto del Centro	Córdoba	240,000	(Argentina) Andrés Romero (5)	TLA
27 Jun	Abierto del Norte	Tucumán	110,000	(Argentina) Jorge Monroy (1)	
12 Sep	Abierto de Misiones	Misiones	110,000	(Argentina) Gustavo Acosta (1)	
3 Oct	Abierto del Litoral	Santa Fe	110,000	(Argentina) Ricardo González (3)	
10 Oct	YPF Classic	Mendoza	138,000	(Argentina) Mauricio Molina (2)	TLA
31 Oct	Carlos Franco Invitational	Paraguay	138,000	(Argentina) Sebastián Fernández (1)	TLA
14 Nov	Campeonato Metropolitano	Buenos Aires	120,000	(Argentina) Rafael Gómez (6)	
28 Nov	Roberto De Vicenzo Classic	Buenos Aires	US$35,000	(Argentina) Daniel Barbetti (1)	TLA
5 Dec	Torneo de Maestros	Buenos Aires	360,000	(Argentina) Andrés Romero (6)	TLA
12 Dec	Abierto Visa de la República	Buenos Aires	US$100,000	(Venezuela) Jhonattan Vegas (n/a)	TLA
16 Jan	Buenos Aires Classic	Buenos Aires	130,000	(Argentina) Rafael Gómez (7)	

== Order of Merit ==
The Order of Merit was based on tournament results during the season, calculated using a points-based system.

Position	Player	Points
1	(Argentina) Andrés Romero	146,340
2	(Argentina) Mauricio Molina	77,716
3	(Argentina) Rafael Gómez	74,788
4	(Argentina) Sebastián Fernández	67,345
5	(Argentina) César Costilla	56,772
