= Óscar David Álvarez =

Colombian professional golfer (born 1983)

Personal information
- Full name: Óscar David Álvarez Ortega
- Nickname: el Mono
- Nationality: Colombia
- Born: 29 March 1983 (age 43) Medellín, Colombia
- Height: 5 ft 10 in (1.78 m)
- Weight: 172 lb (78 kg; 12.3 st)

Career
- Sport: Golf
- College: Brigham Young University
- Turned professional: 2006
- Former tours: PGA Tour Latinoamérica; Tour de las Américas; NGA Hooters Tour
- Professional wins: 9

Best results in major championships
- Masters Tournament: DNP
- PGA Championship: DNP
- U.S. Open: CUT: 2004
- The Open Championship: DNP

Óscar David Álvarez Ortega (born 29 March 1983) is a Colombian professional golfer who currently plays on PGA Tour Latinoamérica.

== Amateur career ==
Early in his career, Álvarez was named Colombia's Amateur Golfer of the Year in 2000. As an amateur, he qualified for the 2004 U.S. Open at Shinnecock Hills Golf Club but failed to make the cut after shooting rounds of 78 and 80. Following this he qualified for the 2004 U.S. Amateur.

At college level, he played at Brigham Young University and was a two time All-American before graduating in 2006.

== Professional career ==
After graduating from the university, Álvarez turned professional in 2006 and joined the Tour de las Américas while also playing on the Colombian Tour. From 2007 he also played on the NGA Hooters Tour. In April 2009, Álvarez won his first professional tournament at the Georgia Sports Orthopedic Specialists Classic on the NGA Hooters Tour. During 2009, he also won the Abierto del Club Campestre de Medellín on the Colombian Tour and in July won his first title on the Tour de las Américas at the 51st Abierto Internacional Ciudad de Bucaramanga A fourth win of the 2009 season came at the XI Abierto de Golf del Serrezuela Country Club in November on the Colombian Tour.

In 2010, Álvarez had continued success on the Tour de las Américas winning the VI Abierto Internacional Eje Cafetero in July, in doing so he became only the fourth Colombian golfer to win at least twice on the tour after Jesús Amaya, Ángel Romero and Eduardo Herrera. His third and final win on the Tour de las Américas was also his biggest win at the 2011 Aberto do Brasil.

In 2012 following the cessation of the Tour de las Américas, Álvarez became a member of the newly formed PGA Tour Latinoamérica but did not enjoy his previous level of success finishing 39th on the inaugural seasons Order of Merit. In 2013, he was again winless on PGA Tour Latinoamérica but had success on the Colombian Tour picked up his third victory on the tour at the 2013 XV Abierto de Golf del Club El Rancho.

In 2014, Álvarez picked up his fourth win on the Colombian Tour at the 2014 54th Copa Sura. Following this he won his first title on PGA Tour Latinoamérica at the 2014 TransAmerican Power Products CRV Mexico Open

== Professional wins (9) ==
=== PGA Tour Latinoamérica wins (1) ===
No.	Date	Tournament	Winning score	Margin of victory	Runner-up
1	19 Oct 2014	TransAmerican Power Products CRV Mexico Open	−17 (66-69-67-69=271)	1 stroke	(Argentina) Nelson Ledesma

=== Tour de las Américas wins (3) ===
No.	Date	Tournament	Winning score	Margin of victory	Runner(s)-up
1	5 Jul 2009	Abierto Internacional Ciudad de Bucaramanga	−13 (66-68-67-72=273)	2 strokes	(Colombia) José Manuel Garrido, (Colombia) Eduardo Herrera
2	5 Jul 2010	Abierto Internacional Eje Cafetero	−13 (72-65-67-67=271)	1 stroke	(Colombia) Álvaro Arizabaleta
3	9 Oct 2011	Aberto do Brasil	−9 (71-68-68-68=275)	1 stroke	(Argentina) César Costilla, (Argentina) Sebastián Fernández

=== NGA Hooters Tour wins (1) ===
No.	Date	Tournament	Winning score	Margin of victory	Runners-up
1	19 Apr 2009	Georgia Sports Orthopedic Specialists Classic	−9 (68-69-69-69=275)	2 strokes	(United States) Ryan Blaum, (United States) Andrew Svoboda

=== Colombian Tour wins (1) ===
No.	Date	Tournament	Winning score	Margin of victory	Runners-up
1	1 Sep 2013	Abierto de Golf de El Rancho	−13 (64-69-69-65=267)	5 strokes	(Colombia) Manuel José Merizalde, (Colombia) Marcelo Rozo, (Colombia) Diego Velásquez

=== Other Colombian wins (3) ===
- 2009 Abierto del Club Campestre de Medellín, Abierto de Golf del Serrezuela Country Club
- 2014 Copa Sura

== Results in major championships ==
Tournament	2004
U.S. Open	CUT

CUT = missed the half-way cut
Note: Álvarez only played in the U.S. Open.

== Team appearances ==
Amateur

- Eisenhower Trophy (representing Colombia): 2000
