= Lomas Open =

The Lomas Open was a golf tournament on the PGA of Argentina Tour, formerly the principal professional golf tour in Argentina. The tournament has been played only ten times, the first in 1964, it has always been held at the Lomas Athletic Golf Club, in Buenos Aires, Buenos Aires Province. It was last held in 2005.

== Winners ==
Year	Winner	Runner-up
2005	Gustavo Acosta	Rodolfo González, Julio Zapata
2003–04	No tournament	
2002	Juan Pablo Abbate	Sebastián Fernández, Rafael Gómez
1992–2001	No tournament	
1991	Ricardo Marzorati	
1987–90	No tournament	
1986	Hugo Vizzone	Armando Saavedra
1985	No tournament	
1984	Florentino Molina & Miguel Prado (amateur)	Pro-Am
1978–83	No tournament	
1977	Florentino Molina	
1974–76	No tournament	
1973	Roberto De Vicenzo	
1971–72	No tournament	
1970	Florentino Molina	
1969	Roberto De Vicenzo	
1965–68	No tournament	
1964	Elcido Nari	
