= Roberto De Vicenzo Punta del Este Open Copa NEC =

Men's golf tournament

Tournament information
- Location: Maldonado, Uruguay
- Established: 2005
- Course: Club del Lago Golf
- Par: 72
- Length: 7,206 yards (6,589 m)
- Tours: PGA Tour Latinoamérica; Tour de las Américas
- Format: Stroke play
- Prize fund: US$175,000
- Month played: October
- Final year: 2017

Tournament record score
- Aggregate: 264 Mito Pereira (2016); 264 Brian Richey (2017)
- To par: −16 as above

Final champion
- (United States) Brian Richey
- Location in Uruguay

The Roberto De Vicenzo Punta del Este Open Copa NEC was a men's professional golf tournament.

First held in 2005 as the Roberto De Vicenzo Classic, it is named after one of Argentina's most successful golfers, Roberto De Vicenzo. The tournament has been held at the San Eliseo Golf Club in Buenos Aires, Argentina until 2012, and moved to the Club de Golf del Uruguay in Montevideo, Uruguay. In 2015, it moved to Club del Lago Golf in Maldonado, Uruguay. All three cities are on the Río de la Plata.

From 2007 to 2011, the tournament was part of the TPG Tour, the official professional golf tour in Argentina. In 2006 and from 2008 to 2010, it was included on the Tour de las Américas schedule. In 2012, it was included on the PGA Tour Latinoamérica schedule. For the 2018 season, it was downgraded to the PGA Tour Latinoamérica Dev Series.

It initially consisted of a pro-am fourball competition over the first two rounds, with just the professionals going on to play in the final two rounds. In 2012, it changed to a 144 player, stroke play tournament.

== Winners ==
Year	Tour(s) (Note: PGATLA − PGA Tour Latinoamérica; TLA − Tour de las Américas; TPG − TPG Tour.)	Winner	Score	To par	Margin of victory	Runner(s)-up
Roberto De Vicenzo Punta del Este Open Copa NEC
2017	PGATLA	(United States) Brian Richey	264	−16	4 strokes	(Argentina) Tommy Cocha
2016	PGATLA	(Chile) Mito Pereira	264	−16	5 strokes	(United States) Tom Whitney
2015	PTGALA	(United States) Lanto Griffin	271	−9	2 strokes	(Puerto Rico) Rafael Campos
Roberto De Vicenzo Invitational Copa NEC
2014	PGATLA	(United States) Ty Capps	272	−16	Playoff	(Argentina) Tommy Cocha
2013	PGATLA	(Mexico) José de Jesús Rodríguez	271	−17	Playoff	(United States) Timothy O'Neal (Argentina) Sebastián Saavedra
2012	PGATLA	(Argentina) Alan Wagner	273	−15	2 strokes	(Argentina) Ariel Cañete (Mexico) Óscar Fraustro
Roberto De Vicenzo Classic
2011	TLA, TPG	(Argentina) Nelson Ledesma	280	−8	Playoff	(Argentina) Rafael Gómez (Argentina) Fernando Zacarias
2010	TLA, TPG	(Argentina) Daniel Barbetti	280	−8	1 stroke	(Argentina) Mauricio Molina
2009	TLA, TPG	(Argentina) Fabián Gómez	279	−9	2 strokes	(Argentina) Sebastián Fernández
2008	TLA, TPG	(Argentina) Paulo Pinto	284	−4	Playoff	(Argentina) Sebastián Fernández
2007	TLA, TPG	(Argentina) Miguel Guzmán	284	−4	Playoff	(Argentina) Sergio Acevedo
2006		(Argentina) Rodolfo González				(Argentina) Luciano Giometti
2005	TLA	(Argentina) Andrés Romero	205	−11	4 strokes	(Argentina) Hernán Rey
