= 2009 TPG Tour =

Golf tour season

2009 TPG Tour season
- Duration: 5 March 2009 – 17 January 2010
- Number of official events: 11
- Most wins: (Argentina) Fabián Gómez (4)
- Order of Merit: (Argentina) César Costilla

The 2009 TPG Tour was the third season of the TPG Tour, the main professional golf tour in Argentina since it was formed in 2007.

== Schedule ==
The following table lists official events during the 2009 season.

Date	Tournament	Location	Purse (Arg$)	Winner (Note: The number in brackets after each winner's name is the number of TPG Tour events they had won up to and including that tournament.)	Other tours (Note: TLA − Tour de las Américas.)
8 Mar	Abierto Norpatagónico	Buenos Aires	90,000	(Argentina) Fabián Gómez (3)	
19 Apr	Abierto del Centro	Córdoba	200,000	(Argentina) Fabián Gómez (4)	TLA
31 May	Abierto del Norte	Tucumán	90,000	(Argentina) Leandro Marelli (a) (1)	
1 Nov	Abierto del Sur	Buenos Aires	90,000	(Argentina) Rodolfo González (1)	
8 Nov	Carlos Franco Invitational	Paraguay	US$30,000	(Argentina) Agustín Jauretche (1)	TLA
15 Nov	Campeonato Metropolitano	Buenos Aires	100,000	(Argentina) Mauricio Molina (1)	
22 Nov	Roberto De Vicenzo Classic	Buenos Aires	135,000	(Argentina) Fabián Gómez (5)	TLA
29 Nov	Abierto del Litoral	Santa Fe	90,000	(Argentina) Ricardo González (2)	
6 Dec	Torneo de Maestros	Buenos Aires	350,000	(United States) Tom Lehman (n/a)	TLA
13 Dec	Abierto Visa de la República	Buenos Aires	US$80,000	(Argentina) César Costilla (1)	TLA
17 Jan	Abierto de la Provincia	Buenos Aires	130,000	(Argentina) Fabián Gómez (6)	

== Order of Merit ==
The Order of Merit was based on tournament results during the season, calculated using a points-based system.

Position	Player	Points
1	(Argentina) César Costilla	101,588
