= David Vanegas =

Colombian professional golfer

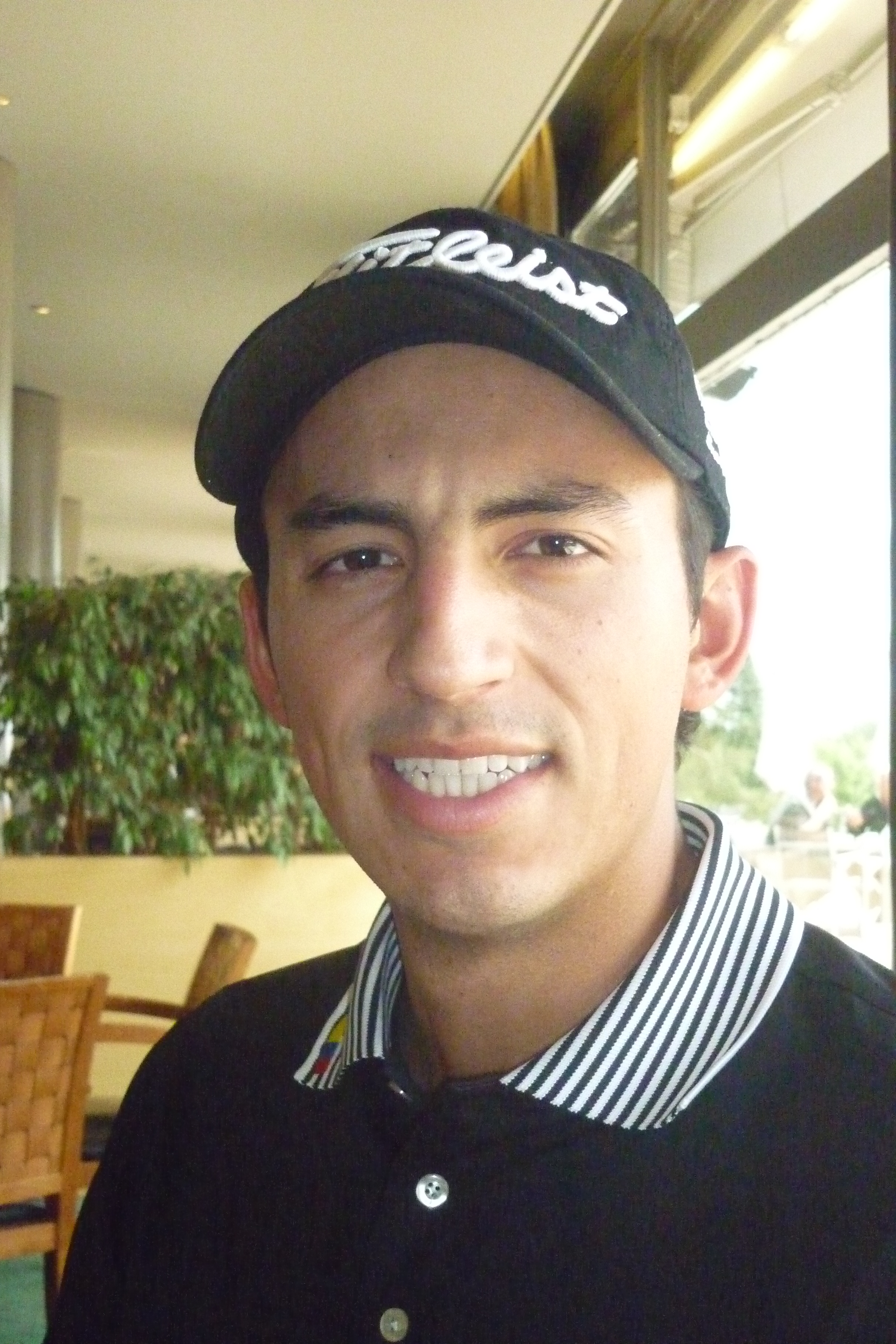

Personal information
- Full name: David Vanegas Posada
- Nationality: Colombia
- Born: 6 December 1986 (age 39) Medellín, Colombia
- Height: 1.88 m (6 ft 2 in)

Career
- Sport: Golf
- College: Johnson & Wales University
- Turned professional: 2008
- Current tour: Colombian Tour
- Former tours: PGA Tour Latinoamérica; Web.com Tour; Challenge Tour; Tour de las Américas; Canadian Tour
- Professional wins: 7

Number of wins by tour
- Challenge Tour: 1
- Other: 6

David Vanegas Posada (born 6 December 1986) is a Colombian professional golfer.

== Early and amateur career ==
Vanegas was born in Medellín. He attended Johnson & Wales University in the state of Florida in the United States.

== Professional career ==
In 2008, Vanegas turned professional. He joined the Tour de las Américas. In 2010 he won for the first time at the season opening Abierto Internacional de Golf II Copa Antioquia played on his home course at Club Campestre El Rodeo in Rionegro. The tournament was co-sanctioned by the European Challenge Tour and the Canadian Tour, and the win earned him exemptions on both of those tours.

== Professional wins (7) ==
=== Challenge Tour wins (1) ===
No.	Date	Tournament	Winning score	Margin of victory	Runner-up
1	21 Feb 2010	Abierto Internacional de Golf II Copa Antioquia^{1}	−12 (67-69-69-67=272)	4 strokes	(United States) Nate Smith

^{1}Co-sanctioned by the Tour de las Américas and the Canadian Tour

=== PGA Tour Latinoamérica wins (1) ===
No.	Date	Tournament	Winning score	Margin of victory	Runners-up
1	23 Feb 2014	Arturo Calle Colombian Open	−17 (66-68-61-68=263)	3 strokes	(United States) Rick Cochran III, (Colombia) Andrés Echavarría

=== Canadian Tour wins (1) ===
No.	Date	Tournament	Winning score	Margin of victory	Runner-up
1	21 Feb 2010	Abierto Internacional de Golf II Copa Antioquia^{1}	−12 (67-69-69-67=272)	4 strokes	(United States) Nate Smith

^{1}Co-sanctioned by the Challenge Tour and the Tour de las Américas

=== Tour de las Américas wins (1) ===
No.	Date	Tournament	Winning score	Margin of victory	Runner-up
1	21 Feb 2010	Abierto Internacional de Golf II Copa Antioquia^{1}	−12 (67-69-69-67=272)	4 strokes	(United States) Nate Smith

^{1}Co-sanctioned by the Challenge Tour and the Canadian Tour

=== Colombian Tour wins (5) ===
No.	Date	Tournament	Winning score	Margin of victory	Runner-up
1	23 Jun 2013	Abierto de Golf Club Campestre de Armenia	−12 (64-68-70-66=268)	Playoff	(Colombia) José Manuel Garrido
2	15 Jun 2014	Abierto de Golf Ciudad de Ibagué	−15 (67-68-67-67=269)	1 stroke	(Colombia) Santiago Tobón
3	29 Nov 2015	Abierto de Golf del Caribe	−9 (71-69-66-73=279)	2 strokes	(Colombia) Jaime Clavijo
4	7 May 2017	Abierto de Golf TPC Cartagena	−12 (69-71-68-68=276)	Playoff	(Colombia) Jaime Clavijo
4	15 Dec 2024	Abierto de Golf del Caribe	−2 (72-72-70=214)	3 strokes	(Colombia) Diego Vanegas

== Team appearances ==
Amateur

- Eisenhower Trophy (representing Colombia): 2006, 2008
