= Chile Open =

Chile Open may refer to:

- Chile Open (golf)
- Chile Open (tennis)
