= Praderas Grand Prix =

The Praderas Grand Prix or Gran Premio Las Praderas is a golf tournament on the TPG Argentina Tour, formerly the principal professional golf tour in Argentina. Founded in 1981, it has always been held at the Praderas de Lujan Golf Club in Luján, Buenos Aires Province. In 1981 the tournament played at 54 holes, in 1997 and 2010 at 36 holes. From 2005 to 2009 the tournament took part in the Progolf Circuit (36 holes tournament). In 2010, the tournament was played twice.

== Winners ==
| Year | Winner | Score | Runner(s)-up |
|---|---|---|---|
| 2013 | Nelson Ledesma | 277 | Rafael Gomez |
| 2012 | César Monasterio* | 203 | Ulises Mendez |
| 2010 | Luciano Dodda | 205 | Sebastián Fernández |
| 2010 | Carlos Pedrozo | 140 | Leonardo Machado, Roberto Coceres, Julio Zapata, Daniel Herrera |
| 2009 | Nico Bollini* | 141 | Isaac Ruiz |
| 2008 | Manuel Garcia | | |
| 2007 | Mauricio Molina | | |
| 2006 | Ricardo Aranda | | |
| 2005 | Claudio Machado | | |
| 2001–04 | No tournament | | |
| 2000 | Sebastián Fernández | | Horacio Carbonetti |
| 1999 | Rubén Alvarez | 274 | José Cóceres, Gustavo Piovano |
| 1998 | | | |
| 1997 | César Monasterio | | |
| 1994–96 | No tournament | | |
| 1993 | Rubén Alvarez | | Ángel Cabrera |
| 1992 | | | |
| 1991 | Rubén Alvarez | 273 | |
| 1990 | Ángel Franco | | |
| 1989 | Luis Carbonetti | 271 | |
| 1988 | Ricardo González | 280 | |
| 1987 | No tournament | | |
| 1986 | Antonio Ortiz* | 282 | Armando Saavedra |
| 1985 | No tournament | | |
| 1984 | Vicente Fernández | 277 | |
| 1983 | Vicente Fernández | 282 | |
| 1982 | Vicente Fernández, Armando Saavedra | 292 | |
| 1981 | Florentino Molina* | 207 | Vicente Fernández |

* – won following playoff
