= Copa Antioquia =

Abierto Internacional Copa Antioquia
Tournament information
- Location: La Macarena, Colombia
- Established: 2009
- Course: Club Campestre
- Par: 71
- Length: 6,788 yards (6,207 m)
- Tours: Canadian Tour; Challenge Tour; Tour de las Américas
- Format: Stroke play
- Prize fund: US$230,000
- Month played: March
- Final year: 2011

Tournament record score
- Aggregate: 272 Peter Gustafsson (2009); 272 David Vanegas (2010)
- To par: −12 David Vanegas (2010)

Final champion
- (Argentina) Joaquín Estévez
- Location in Colombia

The Abierto National Copa Antioquia was an annual golf tournament held in Medellín, Colombia. It was founded in 2009 and formed part of the Latin America based Tour de las Américas.

It became an event on both the second tier European Challenge Tour and the Canadian Tour schedules in 2010.

== Winners ==
Year	Tour(s) (Note: CAN − Canadian Tour; CHA − Challenge Tour; TLA − Tour de las Américas.)	Winner	Score	To par	Margin of victory	Runner-up
Abierto Internacional Copa Antioquia
2011	CHA, TLA	(Argentina) Joaquín Estévez	274	−10	Playoff	(France) Charles-Édouard Russo
Abierto Internacional de Golf II Copa Antioquia
2010	CAN, CHA, TLA	(Colombia) David Vanegas	272	−12	4 strokes	(United States) Nate Smith
Abierto Internacional de Golf Copa Antioquia
2009	TLA	(Sweden) Peter Gustafsson	272	−8	1 stroke	(Argentina) Daniel Altamirano
