= List of people from Highlands Ranch, Colorado =

Coordinates: 39.5539°N 104.9694°W

Location of Highlands Ranch in Colorado

This is a list of some notable people who have lived in the community of Highlands Ranch, Colorado, United States.

== Academia ==
- William C. Davidon (1927–2013), physicist, political activist
- Robert V. Hogg (1924–2014), statistician
- Gitanjali Rao (2005– ), inventor

== Arts and entertainment ==
- Casey Deidrick (1987– ), actor
- Keri Russell (1976– ), actress

== Politics ==
=== State ===
- John Carson, state senator
- Frank McNulty (1973– ), Colorado state legislator

== Sports ==
=== American football ===
- Christian Elliss (1999– ), linebacker
- Noah Elliss (1999– ), defensive tackle
- Sam Jones (1996– ), guard
- Christian McCaffrey (1996– ), running back
- Mike Purcell (1991– ), nose tackle
- Roger Rosengarten (2024-), offensive tackle

=== Basketball ===
- David Arnold (1990– ), shooting guard
- Matt Bouldin (1988– ), shooting guard
- Jake Pemberton (1996– ), American-Israeli shooting guard in the Israeli National League
- Abby Waner (1986– ), shooting guard

=== Soccer ===
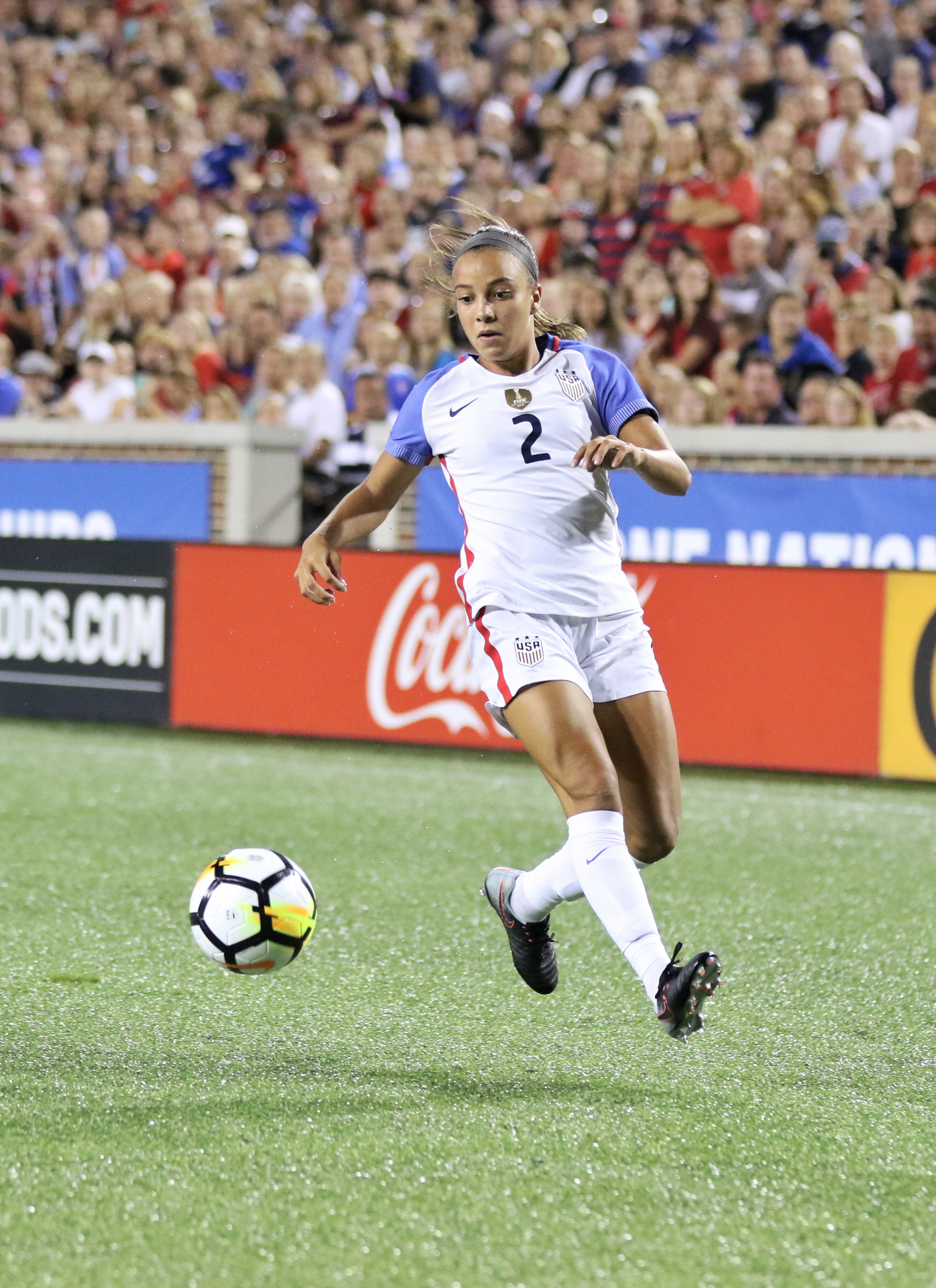
Mallory Pugh

- Janine Beckie (1994– ), forward
- Brian Cvilikas (1984– ), forward
- Ethan Horvath (1995– ), goalkeeper
- Taylor Kemp (1990– ), defender
- Jacob Lissek (1992– ), goalkeeper
- Mallory Pugh (1998– ), forward
- Graham Smith (1995– ), defender
- Chelsea Stewart (1990– ), defender, midfielder
- Brad Stisser (1986– ), forward, winger

=== Other ===
- Alexander Artemev (1985– ), gymnast
- Richard Bachman (1987– ), ice hockey goaltender
- Ty Capps (1983– ), golfer
- Emily Fox (1987– ), world record-setting sport stacker
- Daniel Schlereth (1986– ), baseball pitcher
- Courtney Zablocki (1981– ), luger

== See also ==
- List of people from Colorado
- Bibliography of Colorado
- Geography of Colorado
- History of Colorado
- Index of Colorado-related articles
- List of Colorado-related lists
- Outline of Colorado
