= Mauricio Molina (golfer) =

Argentine golfer (1966–2023)

Personal information
- Nationality: Argentina
- Born: 20 December 1966 Río Cuarto, Córdoba, Argentina
- Died: 13 October 2023 (aged 56) Chile
- Height: 1.72 m (5 ft 8 in)

Career
- Sport: Golf
- Turned professional: 1985
- Former tours: European Tour; Canadian Tour; PGA Tour Latinoamérica; Tour de las Américas; European Senior Tour
- Professional wins: 24

Number of wins by tour
- European Senior Tour: 1
- Other: 23

Mauricio Molina (20 December 1966 – 13 October 2023) was an Argentine professional golfer.

== Career ==
Molina was born in Río Cuarto, Córdoba. He worked as a caddie in Buenos Aires, before turning professional in 1985. He was the nephew of the Argentine golfer, Florentino Molina.

Molina won several tournaments in Argentina and South America, including the Mendoza Open in 1999 and the Metropolitan Championship in 2009. In 1997 he shot 59 in the first round of the Náutico Hacoaj Grand Prix to set the record for the best round in Argentina.

In 2009 Molina played on the Canadian Tour and recorded two victories at the Costa Rica Classic and Mexican PGA Championship, finishing the season in fourth place on the Order of Merit.

Molina played on the European Tour in 1998 and 2001, and the second-tier Challenge Tour between 2003 and 2008. His best tournament finishes were third at the 2004 Costa Rica Open and fifth at the Los Encinos Open in 2005.

Molina finished fifth in the 2018 European Senior Tour qualifying school to gain a place on that tour.

== Death ==
Molina died on 13 October 2023, at the age of 56.

== Professional wins (23) ==
=== Canadian Tour wins (2) ===
No.	Date	Tournament	Winning score	To par	Margin of victory	Runner-up
1	14 Dec 2008 (2009 season)	Costa Rica Classic^{1}	71-65-71-68=275	−13	3 strokes	(United States) Rob Grube
2	20 Apr 2009	Corona Mazatlán Mexican PGA Championship	70-72-66-69=277	−11	Playoff	(United States) Andy Matthews

^{1}Co-sanctioned by the Tour de las Américas

=== Tour de las Américas wins (2) ===
No.	Date	Tournament	Winning score	To par	Margin of victory	Runner(s)-up
1	14 Dec 2008	Costa Rica Classic^{1}	71-65-71-68=275	−13	3 strokes	(United States) Rob Grube
2	10 Oct 2010	YPF Classic^{2}	67-69-68-68=272	−8	3 strokes	(Argentina) Félix Córdoba, (Argentina) Rodolfo González

^{1}Co-sanctioned by the Canadian Tour
^{2}Co-sanctioned by the TPG Tour

=== TPG Tour wins (4) ===
No.	Date	Tournament	Winning score	To par	Margin of victory	Runner(s)-up
1	15 Nov 2009	Campeonato Metropolitano	65-64-71-66=266	−14	1 stroke	(Argentina) Gustavo Acosta, (Argentina) Roberto Cóceres
2	10 Oct 2010	YPF Classic^{1}	67-69-68-68=272	−8	3 strokes	(Argentina) Félix Córdoba, (Argentina) Rodolfo González
3	26 Feb 2012	Abierto del Sur	69-63-64=196	−14	4 strokes	(Argentina) Rafael Echenique
4	20 Dec 2014	Tour Argentino Championship	78-66-65-65=274	−10	Playoff	(Argentina) Nelson Ledesma, (Argentina) Francisco Ojeda

^{1}Co-sanctioned by the Tour de las Américas

=== Chilean Tour wins (2) ===
No.	Date	Tournament	Winning score	To par	Margin of victory	Runner-up
1	7 Apr 2013	Abierto Los Lirios	72-71-68-65=276	−12	5 strokes	(Chile) Gustavo Silva
2	27 Oct 2013	Abierto Internacional de Golf Hacienda de Chicureo	71-69-72-70=282	−6	5 strokes	(Chile) Santiago Russi

=== Argentine wins (2) ===
- 1997 Náutico Hacoaj Grand Prix
- 1999 Mendoza Open

=== Cordoba Tour wins (2) ===
- 2002 Río Cuarto Tournament
- 2003 Villa María Tournament

=== Other wins in Argentina (5) ===
- 1996 Pilar Grand Prix (Driving Range Circuit)
- 1997 SHA Grand Prix Pro-Am
- 2007 Los Lagartos Tournament (ProGolf Tour), Las Praderas Tournament (ProGolf Tour)
- 2012 Juan J. Galli Cup

=== Other South American wins (5) ===
- 1994 Ecuador Open
- 2006 Hacienda de Chicureo Open (Chile)
- 2012 Chile Open
- 2013 Santa Augusta Open (Chile), CBG PRO TOUR Brasília (Brazil)

=== European Senior Tour wins (1) ===
No.	Date	Tournament	Winning score	To par	Margin of victory	Runner-up
1	10 Oct 2021	Riegler & Partner Legends	66-66-67=199	−17	4 strokes	(Argentina) José Cóceres

== Results in senior major championships ==
Tournament	2017	2018	2019	2020	2021	2022	2023
The Tradition				NT			
Senior PGA Championship			CUT	NT	CUT	CUT	CUT
U.S. Senior Open				NT	CUT	CUT	CUT
Senior Players Championship							
Senior British Open Championship	T38	T64	T18	NT	T43	T3	T53

Top 10
Did not play

"T" indicates a tie for a place
CUT = missed the halfway cut
NT = No tournament due to COVID-19 pandemic
