= 2011 Tour de las Américas =

Golf tour season

2011 Tour de las Américas season
- Duration: 3 March 2011 – 18 December 2011
- Number of official events: 17
- Most wins: (Chile) Benjamín Alvarado (2)
- Order of Merit: (Argentina) Joaquín Estévez

The 2011 Tour de las Américas was the 20th season of the Tour de las Américas (formerly the South American Tour), the main professional golf tour in Latin America since it was formed in 1991.

== OWGR inclusion ==
In August 2010, it was announced that all Tour de las Américas events, beginning in 2011, would receive Official World Golf Ranking points at the minimum level of 6 points for the winner of a 72-hole event.

== Schedule ==
The following table lists official events during the 2011 season.

Date	Tournament	Host country	Purse (US$)	Winner (Note: The number in brackets after each winner's name is the number of Tour de las Américas events they had won up to and including that tournament.)	OWGR points	Other tours (Note: CAN − Canadian Tour; CHA − Challenge Tour; TPG − TPG Tour.)
6 Mar	Abierto de Chile	Chile	40,000	(Chile) Benjamín Alvarado (1)	6	
13 Mar	Abierto Internacional de Golf Copa Antioquia	Colombia	230,000	(Argentina) Joaquín Estévez (1)	12	CHA
20 Mar	Pacific Colombia Tour Barranquilla	Colombia	100,000	(United States) Cody Slover (n/a)	6	CAN
27 Mar	Pacific Colombia Tour Championship	Colombia	130,000	(Canada) Adam Hadwin (n/a)	6	CAN
23 Apr	Abierto del Centro	Argentina	Arg$300,000	(Paraguay) Héctor Céspedes (1)	6	TPG
22 May	Televisa TLA Players Championship	Mexico	70,000	(Argentina) Julián Etulain (3)	n/a	
29 May	Toyota Peru Open	Peru	100,000	(Chile) Benjamín Alvarado (2)	6	
10 Jul	Abierto de Golf Ciudad de Bucaramanga	Colombia	50,000	(Colombia) Álvaro Arizabaleta (1)	6	
17 Jul	Abierto Internacional de Golf Copa Sura	Colombia	50,000	(Argentina) César Costilla (2)	6	
9 Oct	Aberto do Brasil	Brazil	160,000	(Colombia) Óscar David Álvarez (3)	6	
16 Oct	Abierto Internacional de Golf Hacienda Chicureo Copa Claro	Chile	40,000	(Argentina) Paulo Pinto (4)	6	
30 Oct	Abierto del Nordeste	Argentina	Arg$250,000	(Argentina) Emilio Domínguez (2)	6	TPG
6 Nov	Carlos Franco Invitational	Paraguay	40,000	(Paraguay) Fabrizio Zanotti (2)	6	TPG
20 Nov	Roberto De Vicenzo Classic	Argentina	40,000	(Argentina) Nelson Ledesma (1)	6	TPG
4 Dec	Torneo de Maestros	Argentina	Arg$400,000	(Argentina) José Cóceres (1)	6	TPG
11 Dec	Visa Open de Argentina	Argentina	115,000	(Argentina) Maximiliano Godoy (1)	6	TPG
18 Dec	Abierto Sport Francés Copa Nissan	Chile	80,000	(Chile) Francisco Cerda (1)	6	

== Order of Merit ==
The Order of Merit was based on tournament results during the season, calculated using a points-based system.

Position	Player	Points
1	(Argentina) Joaquín Estévez	51,970
2	(Chile) Benjamín Alvarado	48,800
3	(Argentina) César Costilla	45,006
4	(Colombia) Diego Vanegas	42,883
5	(Argentina) Julián Etulain	39,233
