= Argentine Senior PGA Championship =

The Argentine Senior PGA Championship, or Campeonato Argentino de Profesionales Senior, is a senior men's professional golf tournament held in Argentina that was founded in 1987.

The first winner was Juan Carlos Molina. The most successful players are Florentino Molina and Horacio Carbonetti with three victories each.

== Winners ==
Year	Winner	Score	Runner up
2008	No tournament		
2007	Dionicio Rios*	213	Antonio Ortiz
2006	Alfonso Barrera	211	Armando Saavedra
2005	No tournament		
2004	Horacio Carbonetti, Adan Sowa (tie)		
2003	Horacio Carbonetti		
2002	Antonio Ortiz		Horacio Carbonetti
2001			
2000			
1999	Vicente Fernández		
1998	Horacio Carbonetti		Vicente Fernández
1997			
1996	Vicente Fernández		
1995	Florentino Molina		
1994	Antonio Garrido		
1993			
1992	Florentino Molina		
1991	Florentino Molina		
1990	Fidel de Luca		
1989			
1988			
1987	Juan Carlos Molina		
