= Benjamín Alvarado =

Chilean professional golfer (born 1985)

Personal information
- Nationality: Chile
- Born: 2 September 1985 (age 41) Santiago, Chile
- Height: 1.82 m (6 ft 0 in)
- Weight: 72 kg (159 lb; 11.3 st)
- Spouse: Lucila Vit (m. 2012; div. 2016)

Career
- Sport: Golf
- College: Arizona State University
- Turned professional: 2007
- Former tours: PGA Tour; Web.com Tour; Challenge Tour; PGA Tour Latinoamérica; Tour de las Américas; Canadian Tour; Chilean Tour
- Professional wins: 12

Number of wins by tour
- Korn Ferry Tour: 1
- Other: 11

Benjamín Alvarado (born 2 September 1985) is a Chilean professional golfer.

== Early life and amateur career ==
Alvarado was born in Santiago, Chile. He played college golf at Arizona State University, earning All-American honors in 2006 and 2007.

== Professional career ==
In 2007, Alvarado turned professional. Alvarado has played on the Challenge Tour in 2008 and 2009; the Tour de las Américas, winning twice in 2011 and finishing second on the Order of Merit; the Canadian Tour, finishing third on the Order of Merit in 2011; PGA Tour Latinoamérica, finishing 23rd on the 2012 Order of Merit; and the Web.com Tour, winning the 2013 Brasil Classic to earn his tour card. Alvarado is the first Chilean winner on the Web.com Tour and was a last-minute sponsor exemption for the Brazil event. He finished 11th on the 2013 Web.com Tour regular-season money list to earn his 2014 PGA Tour card. Alvarado is the first Chilean to earn a PGA Tour card. In 2013–14, he made only one cut in six events, finished 240th on the FedEx Cup points list and lost his PGA Tour card.

== Personal life ==
Alvarado married model and presenter Lucila Vit in 2012. They divorced in 2016.

== Amateur wins ==
- 2001 South American Championship
- 2002 Junior Orange Bowl

== Professional wins (12) ==
=== Web.com Tour wins (1) ===
No.	Date	Tournament	Winning score	Margin of victory	Runner-up
1	10 Apr 2013	Brasil Classic	−19 (67-63-66-69=265)	1 stroke	(South Africa) Dawie van der Walt

=== Tour de las Américas wins (2) ===
No.	Date	Tournament	Winning score	Margin of victory	Runner(s)-up
1	6 Mar 2011	Abierto de Chile	−22 (66-67-66-67=266)	8 strokes	(Argentina) Mauricio Molina, (Argentina) Sebastián Saavedra
2	29 May 2011	Toyota Peru Open	−15 (69-70-65-69=273)	2 strokes	(Argentina) Julián Etulain

=== Chilean Tour wins (5) ===
No.	Date	Tournament	Winning score	Margin of victory	Runner(s)-up
1	17 Feb 2018	Abierto La Serena	−8 (72-69-67=208)	1 stroke	(Bolivia) Kevin Muriel, (Chile) Mark Tullo
2	4 Mar 2018	Abierto Los Lirios	−13 (70-73-68-64=275)	Playoff	(Chile) Mark Tullo
3	13 Oct 2019	Abierto Hacienda Chicureo	−7 (71-71-67=209)	Playoff	(Chile) Mark Tullo
4	22 Jan 2022	Abierto Rocas de Santo Domingo	−6 (72-68-70=210)	2 strokes	(Chile) Felipe Aguilar, (Chile) Gustavo Silva
5	20 Nov 2022	Abierto La Dehesa	−12 (71-69-64=204)	4 strokes	(Chile) Agustín Errázuriz

=== FG Sports Tour wins (1) ===
No.	Date	Tournament	Winning score	Margin of victory	Runner-up
1	26 Sep 2021	3° Fecha	−8 (72-67-69=208)	3 strokes	(Chile) Benjamín Saiz-Wenz

=== Other wins (3) ===
- 2003 Abierto de Chile (as an amateur)
- 2007 Abierto Hacienda Chicureo (Chile)
- 2008 Abierto Hacienda Chicureo (Chile)

== Team appearances ==
- Eisenhower Trophy (representing Chile): 2002, 2004, 2006

== See also ==
- 2013 Web.com Tour Finals graduates
