= 2009 Tour de las Américas =

Golf tour season

2009 Tour de las Américas season
- Duration: 12 March 2009 – 13 December 2009
- Number of official events: 14
- Most wins: (Argentina) Fabián Gómez (2) (Argentina) Agustín Jauretche (2)
- Order of Merit: (Sweden) Peter Gustafsson

The 2009 Tour de las Américas was the 18th season of the Tour de las Américas (formerly the South American Tour), the main professional golf tour in Latin America since it was formed in 1991.

== Schedule ==
The following table lists official events during the 2009 season.

Date	Tournament	Host country	Purse (US$)	Winner (Note: The number in brackets after each winner's name is the number of Tour de las Américas events they had won up to and including that tournament.)	OWGR points	Other tours (Note: CHA − Challenge Tour; TPG − TPG Tour.)
15 Mar	Abierto Internacional de Golf Copa Antioquia	Colombia	130,000	(Sweden) Peter Gustafsson (1)	n/a	
22 Mar	Club Colombia Masters	Colombia	200,000	(Argentina) Alan Wagner (2)	12	CHA
19 Apr	Abierto del Centro	Argentina	Arg$200,000	(Argentina) Fabián Gómez (3)	n/a	TPG
26 Apr	Televisa TLA Players Championship	Mexico	70,000	(Colombia) Eduardo Herrera (2)	n/a	
23 May	Copa 3 Diamantes Mitsubishi	Venezuela	Bs.F225,000	(Argentina) Paulo Pinto (3)	n/a	
27 Jun	Venezuela Open	Venezuela	60,000	(Argentina) Daniel Barbetti (2)	n/a	
5 Jul	Abierto Internacional Ciudad de Bucaramanga	Colombia	50,000	(Colombia) Óscar David Álvarez (1)	n/a	
19 Jul	Abierto Internacional de Golf Copa Suramericana	Colombia	45,000	(Colombia) José Manuel Garrido (1)	n/a	
12 Oct	Abierto de Chile Copa BCI	Chile	30,000	(Argentina) Agustín Jauretche (1)	n/a	
18 Oct	Abierto Hacienda Chicureo	Chile	30,000	(Argentina) Luciano Giometti (2)	n/a	
8 Nov	Carlos Franco Invitational	Paraguay	30,000	(Argentina) Agustín Jauretche (2)	n/a	TPG
22 Nov	Roberto De Vicenzo Classic	Argentina	Arg$135,000	(Argentina) Fabián Gómez (4)	n/a	TPG
6 Dec	Torneo de Maestros	Argentina	Arg$350,000	(United States) Tom Lehman (n/a)	n/a	TPG
13 Dec	Abierto Visa de la República	Argentina	80,000	(Argentina) César Costilla (1)	n/a	TPG

== Order of Merit ==
The Order of Merit was based on tournament results during the season, calculated using a points-based system.

Position	Player	Points
1	(Sweden) Peter Gustafsson	40,934
2	(Argentina) Julio Zapata	28,023
3	(Argentina) Daniel Barbetti	26,780
4	(Argentina) Paulo Pinto	25,650
5	(Colombia) Eduardo Herrera	21,100
