= 2011 TPG Tour =

Golf tour season

2011 TPG Tour season
- Duration: 23 February 2011 – 17 December 2011
- Number of official events: 15
- Most wins: (Argentina) Emilio Domínguez (2) (Argentina) Nelson Ledesma (2)
- Order of Merit: (Argentina) Maximiliano Godoy

The 2011 TPG Tour was the fifth season of the TPG Tour, the main professional golf tour in Argentina since it was formed in 2007.

== Schedule ==
The following table lists official events during the 2011 season.

Date	Tournament	Location	Purse (Arg$)	Winner (Note: The number in brackets after each winner's name is the number of TPG Tour events they had won up to and including that tournament.)	OWGR points	Other tours (Note: TLA − Tour de las Américas.)
26 Feb	Abierto del Sur	Buenos Aires	130,000	(Argentina) Matías O'Curry (1)	n/a	
3 Apr	Abierto Norpatagónico	Buenos Aires	130,000	(Argentina) Emilio Domínguez (1)	n/a	
17 Apr	Copa Juan José Luis Galli	Entre Ríos	130,000	(Argentina) Joaquín Estévez (1) and (Argentina) Daniel Vancsik (1)	n/a	
23 Apr	Abierto del Centro	Córdoba	300,000	(Paraguay) Héctor Céspedes (1)	6	TLA
5 Jun	Abierto de Misiones	Misiones	140,000	(Argentina) Paulo Pinto (3)	n/a	
18 Jun	Abierto Termas de Río Hondo	Santiago del Estero	140,000	(Argentina) Nelson Ledesma (1)	n/a	
1 Oct	Abierto del Norte	Tucumán	200,000	(Argentina) Miguel Rodríguez (3)	n/a	
30 Oct	Abierto del Nordeste	Chaco	250,000	(Argentina) Emilio Domínguez (2)	6	TLA
6 Nov	Carlos Franco Invitational	Paraguay	US$40,000	(Paraguay) Fabrizio Zanotti (n/a)	6	TLA
13 Nov	Gran Premio Los Pingüinos	Buenos Aires	125,000	(Argentina) Andrés Romero (7)	n/a	
20 Nov	Roberto De Vicenzo Classic	Buenos Aires	US$40,000	(Argentina) Nelson Ledesma (2)	6	TLA
26 Nov	Argentine PGA Championship	Tucumán	250,000	(Argentina) Sebastián Fernández (2)	n/a	
4 Dec	Torneo de Maestros	Buenos Aires	400,000	(Argentina) José Cóceres (1)	6	TLA
11 Dec	Visa Open de Argentina	Buenos Aires	US$115,000	(Argentina) Maximiliano Godoy (1)	6	TLA
17 Dec	Ángel Cabrera Classic	Córdoba	200,000	(Argentina) Estanislao Goya (2)	n/a	

== Order of Merit ==
The Order of Merit was based on tournament results during the season, calculated using a points-based system.

Position	Player	Points
1	(Argentina) Maximiliano Godoy	111,343
2	(Argentina) Emilio Domínguez	110,989
3	(Argentina) Andrés Romero	105,147
4	(Argentina) Sebastián Fernández	96,547
5	(Paraguay) Héctor Céspedes	83,681
