= Matías O'Curry =

Argentine golfer

Personal information
- Nationality: Argentina
- Born: 27 September 1982 (age 44) Buenos Aires, Argentina
- Height: 6 ft 2 in (1.88 m)
- Weight: 198 lb (90 kg; 14.1 st)

Career
- Sport: Golf
- Turned professional: 2006
- Current tour: TPG Tour
- Former tours: Web.com Tour; PGA Tour Latinoamérica; Tour de las Américas
- Professional wins: 2

Matías O'Curry (born 27 September 1982) is an Argentine professional golfer who currently plays on the TPG Tour, having previously played on the Web.com Tour, PGA Tour Latinoamérica and the Tour de las Américas.

== Amateur career ==
As a junior, O'Curry won the Argentine Junior Championships. He followed this up by winning the Emilio Pereira Iraola Cup as the low amateur in the Argentine Open.

== Professional career ==
O'Curry turned professional in 2006 and initially played on the Argentine Tour and the Tour de las Américas in South America. His first win as a professional came at the Abierto del Sur on the Argentine Tour in 2011.

In 2012, O'Curry joined PGA Tour Latinoamérica and achieved his first win at the 2012 Arturo Calle Colombian Open. This win along with several other strong finishes lead to a 4th-place finish on the PGA Tour Latinoamérica Order of Merit for 2012 which earned O'Curry his playing rights on the Web.com Tour for 2013.

In 2013, O'Curry had a poor season only making four cuts in twenty starts on the Web.com Tour.

In 2014, O'Curry rejoined PGA Tour Latinoamérica.

== Amateur wins ==
- 1999 Emilio Pereira Iraola Cup (as low amateur at the Argentine Open).

== Professional wins (1) ==
=== PGA Tour Latinoamérica wins (1) ===
No.	Date	Tournament	Winning score	Margin of victory	Runners-up
1	23 Sep 2012	Arturo Calle Colombian Open	−9 (71-69-68-71=279)	8 strokes	(Colombia) Andrés Echavarría, (Argentina) Nelson Ledesma

=== TPG Tour wins (1) ===
No.	Date	Tournament	Winning score	Margin of victory	Runner-up
1	26 Feb 2011	Abierto del Sur	−17 (64-66-67-66=263)	2 strokes	(Argentina) Clodomiro Carranza
