= Peter Gustafsson =

Swedish professional golfer (born 1976)

Personal information
- Full name: Peter Gustafsson
- Nationality: Sweden
- Born: 17 August 1976 (age 50) Orust, Sweden
- Height: 1.87 m (6 ft 2 in)

Career
- Sport: Golf
- Turned professional: 1999
- Former tours: European Tour; Challenge Tour; Tour de las Américas
- Professional wins: 9

Achievements and awards
- Tour de las Américas Order of Merit winner: 2009

Peter Gustafsson (born 17 August 1976) is a Swedish professional golfer.

== Career ==
In 1976, Gustafsson was born. He grew up in Orust, Sweden.

In 1999, Gustafsson turned professional. In 2004, he just missing out on automatic graduation from the Challenge Tour. In 2005, Gustafsson was medalist at the European Tour Qualifying School to gain his place on the European Tour. In his début season he was runner up in two tournaments, the Jazztel Open de España en Andalucía and the Omega European Masters, and finished in 46th place on the Order of Merit. Despite that, he missed out on the Sir Henry Cotton Rookie of the Year award, which went to Gonzalo Fernández-Castaño of Spain. In subsequent seasons, he was unable to consistently produce those same high levels of performance, and lost his place on the European Tour in 2007.

In 2009, Gustafsson won the Abierto Internacional de Golf Copa Antioquia, the opening event of the Tour de las Américas season, in Colombia, coming from behind in the final round to claim victory by one stroke. He rounded off the season with top five finishes in both the Argentine Masters and the Argentine Open as he ended the year as winner of the Tour de las Américas Order of Merit for 2009.

== Awards and honors ==
In 2009, Gustafsson won the Tour de las Américas Order of Merit.

== Professional wins (9) ==
=== Tour de las Américas wins (1) ===
No.	Date	Tournament	Winning score	Margin of victory	Runner-up
1	15 Mar 2009	Abierto Internacional de Golf Copa Antioquia	−8 (69-69-68-66=272)	1 stroke	(Argentina) Daniel Altamirano

=== Nordic Golf League wins (3) ===
No.	Date	Tournament	Winning score	Margin of victory	Runner-up
1	12 Aug 1999	GE Capital Bank Open	−12 (67-61-67=195)	2 strokes	(Sweden) Peter Malmgren
2	24 Sep 1999	Audi Open Finale	−10 (69-67-70=206)	3 strokes	(Norway) Lars Brovold (a)
3	8 Sep 2002	Holiday Club Open	−5 (71-69-71=211)	1 stroke	(Finland) Janne Mommo

=== Other wins (5) ===
- 1997 Telia Tour Höstkval 2
- 2002 Lear Open Silfverschiöldspokalen
- 2005 Orust Open
- 2006 Orust Open
- 2017 Aegean Airlines Pro-Am (PGAs of Europe)

== Playoff record ==
European Tour playoff record (0–1)

No.	Year	Tournament	Opponent	Result
1	2005	Jazztel Open de España en Andalucía	(Sweden) Peter Hanson	Lost to par on first extra hole

== See also ==
- 2011 European Tour Qualifying School graduates
