= Guillermo Encina =

Chilean professional golfer

Personal information
- Nationality: Chile
- Born: 7 November 1951 (age 74) Santiago, Chile
- Height: 1.70 m (5 ft 7 in)
- Weight: 75 kg (165 lb; 11.8 st)

Career
- Sport: Golf
- Turned professional: 1975
- Former tours: South African Tour; Canadian Tour; European Seniors Tour
- Professional wins: 6

Number of wins by tour
- European Senior Tour: 1
- Other: 5

Guillermo Encina (born 7 November 1951) is a Chilean professional golfer.

== Career ==
Encina was born in Santiago, Chile. He was taught the game by his father, the head greenskeeper at the Papudo Club in Chile, and turned professional in 1975. He won several tournaments in his home country, including the Chile Open five times, and spent time on the South African and Canadian tours and the pre-Asian Tour Asian circuit. He represented Chile at the World Cup four times.

After turning 50, Encina joined the European Seniors Tour. He made the top thirty on the Order of Merit each season from 2002 through 2006, with a highest ranking of sixth in 2003. He won his first European Seniors Tour event in 2006.

== Professional wins (6) ==
=== Other wins (5) ===
- 1988 Chile Open
- 1990 Chile Open
- 1991 Chile Open
- 1999 Chile Open
- 2001 Chile Open

=== European Seniors Tour wins (1) ===
No.	Date	Tournament	Winning score	Margin of victory	Runners-up
1	11 Jun 2006	Irvine Whitlock Seniors Classic	−7 (72-71-66=209)	3 strokes	(United States) Rex Caldwell, (New Zealand) Simon Owen, (United States) Alan Tapie

European Seniors Tour playoff record (0–1)

No.	Year	Tournament	Opponents	Result
1	2006	AIB Irish Seniors Open	(United States) Jerry Bruner, (Australia) Stewart Ginn, (Scotland) Sam Torrance	Torrance won with eagle on second extra hole Encina and Ginn eliminated by birdie on first hole

== Team appearances ==
- World Cup (representing Chile): 1993, 1996, 1998, 1999
