= Metropolitan Championship =

Golf tournament in Argentina

The Metropolitan Championship, or Campeonato Metropolitano, was a professional golf tournament on the PGA of Argentina Tour, formerly the principal professional golf tour in Argentina. First held in 1955, it has always been held at the Palermo Golf Club, in Buenos Aires, Buenos Aires Province.

== Winners ==
Year	Winner	Score	Runner(s)-up
2010	Rafael Gómez	263	Sebastián Fernández
2009	Mauricio Molina	266	Roberto Coceres, Gustavo Acosta
2008	No tournament		
2007	José Cóceres	273	Amalio Britez
2001–06	No tournament		
2000	Rubén Alvarez	270	Rodolofo Gonzalez
1999	Pedro Martínez	272	Armando Saavedra
1998	Jeff Schmid*	270	Ricardo Montenegro
1997	Denny Tymosko*	269	Rubén Alvarez
1993–96	No tournament		
1992	Armando Saavedra		
1986–91	No tournament		
1985	Alejandro Quevedo	142	Domingo Pascualucci
1982–84	No tournament		
1981	Florentino Molina*	277	Jorge Soto
1980	No tournament		
1979	Florentino Molina		
1978	Adan Sowa	279	Juan Carlos Molina
1977	Florentino Molina	274	Horacio Carbonetti
1976	Roberto De Vicenzo*	280	Florentino Molina
1975	No tournament		
1974	Vicente Fernández	273	Juan Querelos
1971–73	No tournament		
1970	Fidel de Luca	272	Francisco Cerdá
1967–69	No tournament		
1966	Ángel Ponzio	282	Elcido Nari
1965	Leopoldo Ruiz	281	Juan Martinez
1961–64	No tournament		
1960	Orlando Tudino	289	Enrique Bertolino
1959	Leopoldo Ruiz	289	Fidel de Luca
1956–58	No tournament		
1955	Enrique Bertolino	281	Arturo Soto

* – won following playoff
