= Joaquín Estévez =

Argentine golfer

Personal information
- Nationality: Argentina
- Born: 22 September 1984 (age 42) Bahía Blanca, Argentina

Career
- Sport: Golf
- Turned professional: 2008
- Former tours: Tour de las Américas; Challenge Tour
- Professional wins: 2

Number of wins by tour
- Challenge Tour: 1
- Other: 1

Achievements and awards
- Tour de las Américas Order of Merit winner: 2011

Joaquín Estévez (born 22 September 1984) is an Argentinian professional golfer who plays on the Challenge Tour and the Tour de las Américas.

== Career ==
Estévez turned pro in 2008 and picked up his first professional win in 2011, the Copa Antioquia, an event sanctioned by the Challenge Tour and the Tour de las Américas.

== Professional wins (2) ==
=== Challenge Tour wins (1) ===
No.	Date	Tournament	Winning score	Margin of victory	Runner-up
1	13 Mar 2011	Abierto Internacional Copa Antioquia^{1}	−10 (68-69-70-67=274)	Playoff	(France) Charles-Édouard Russo

^{1}Co-sanctioned by the Tour de las Américas

Challenge Tour playoff record (1–0)

No.	Year	Tournament	Opponent	Result
1	2011	Abierto Internacional Copa Antioquia	(France) Charles-Édouard Russo	Won with birdie on first extra hole

=== Tour de las Américas wins (1) ===
No.	Date	Tournament	Winning score	Margin of victory	Runner-up
1	13 Mar 2011	Abierto Internacional Copa Antioquia^{1}	−10 (68-69-70-67=274)	Playoff	(France) Charles-Édouard Russo

^{1}Co-sanctioned by the Challenge Tour

=== TPG Tour wins (1) ===
No.	Date	Tournament	Winning score	Margin of victory	Runners-up
1	17 Apr 2011	Copa Juan José Luis Galli (with (Argentina) Daniel Vancsik)	−18 (62-75-64=201)	1 stroke	(Argentina) Gustavo Acosta and (Argentina) Julio Zapata
