= Charles-Édouard Russo =

French professional golfer

Personal information
- Nationality: France
- Born: 5 August 1980 (age 46) Paris, France
- Height: 5 ft 9 in (1.75 m)
- Weight: 158 lb (72 kg; 11.3 st)

Career
- Sport: Golf
- Turned professional: 2003
- Former tours: European Tour; Challenge Tour
- Professional wins: 2

Charles-Édouard Russo (born 5 August 1980) is a French professional golfer who plays on the European Tour.

== Career ==
Russo turned professional in 2003 and began playing on the second-tier Challenge Tour in 2008, finishing 109th in the season-end rankings. He improved considerably to 48th in 2009, and further improved in 2010, recording his best result to date with a runner-up finish in the Allianz Golf Open du Grand Toulouse, and just missing out on a European Tour card by finishing 24th in the standings. In 2011, he recorded two further runner-up finishes on his way to 17th in the standings, which earned him a 2012 European Tour card.

== Professional wins (2) ==
=== Alps Tour wins (2) ===
No.	Date	Tournament	Winning score	Margin of victory	Runner(s)-up
1	6 Oct 2006	Cordial Resort Pelagone Open	−10 (64-71-68=203)	1 stroke	(Austria) Leo Astl, (France) Christophe Brazillier
2	9 May 2007	Maremma International Cordial Open	−10 (65-68-70=203)	2 strokes	(Austria) Roland Steiner

== Playoff record ==
Challenge Tour playoff record (0–1)

No.	Year	Tournament	Opponent	Result
1	2011	Abierto Internacional Copa Antioquia	(Argentina) Joaquín Estévez	Lost to birdie on first extra hole

== See also ==
- 2011 Challenge Tour graduates
