= Acantilados Grand Prix =

Annual golf tournament in Argentina

The Acantilados Grand Prix or Gran Premio Los Acantilados was a golf tournament on the PGA of Argentina Tour, formerly the principal professional golf tour in Argentina. Founded in 1954, it was always been held at the Club de Golf Los Acantilados in Mar del Plata, Buenos Aires Province. It was last held in 2006.

== Winners ==
Year	Winner	Score	Runner-up
2006	Juan Pablo Abbate	269	Clodomiro Carranza
2005	Clodomiro Carranza	202	Julio Zapata
2004	Horacio Carbonetti	268	Jorge Berendt, Luis Carbonetti, Clodomiro Carranza
2003	No tournament		
2002	César Monasterio	202	Jorge Berendt, José Cantero, Eduardo Argiro
2001	Miguel Guzmán		César Monasterio
2000	Sebastián Fernández	271	José Cóceres, Alberto Giannone, Rodolfo Gonzalez, Gustavo Rojas
1993–99	No tournament		
1992	Rubén Alvarez		
1991	Eduardo Romero		
1990			
1989			
1988	Jorge Berendt	212	José Cóceres, Miguel Guzmán
1987			
1986			
1985	Armando Saavedra*		Miguel Fernandez
1984	Vicente Fernández*	283	Florentino Molina
1983	Jorge Soto	278	Vicente Fernández, Armando Saavedra
1982	Florentino Molina	277	Roberto De Vicenzo, Horacio Carbonetti, Jorge Soto
1981	Vicente Fernández	276	Juan Carlos Molina, Florentino Molina
1980	Horacio Carbonetti	280	Jorge Soto
1979	Roberto De Vicenzo*		Armando Saavedra
1978			
1977	Vicente Fernández	273	
1976	Juan Quinteros	273	
1975	Florentino Molina		
1974	Vicente Fernández	284	Florentino Molina, Alejandro Quevedo
1973	Vicente Fernández		
1972	Roberto De Vicenzo		
1971	Roberto De Vicenzo		
1970	Vicente Fernández		
1969			
1968	Roberto De Vicenzo	282	Elcido Nari
1967			
1966			
1965	Roberto De Vicenzo		
1964			
1963	Florentino Molina		
1962	No tournament		
1961	Fidel de Luca		
1955–60	No tournament		
1954	Antonio Cerdá		

* – won following playoff
