= Adan Sowa =

Argentine golfer

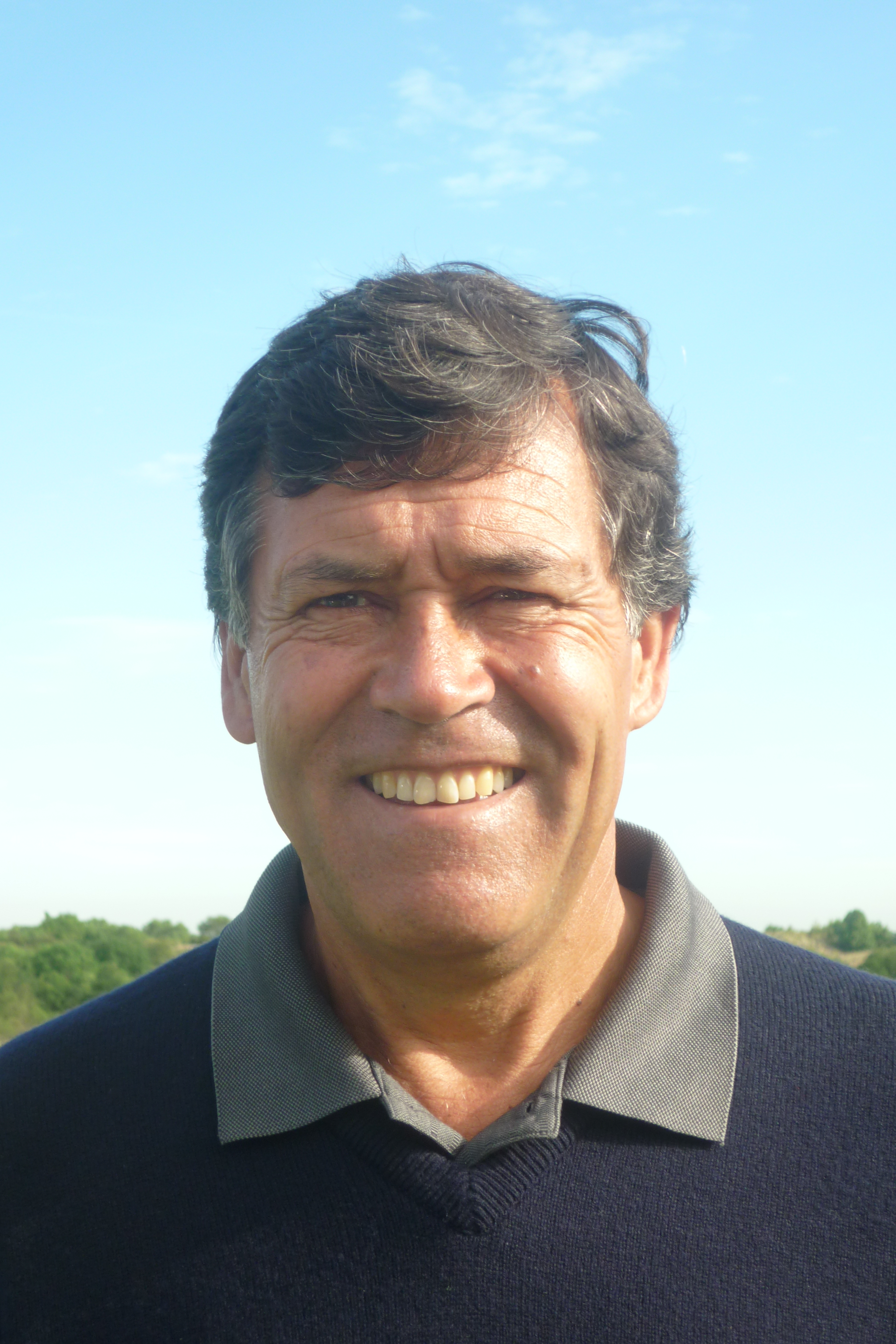

Personal information
- Full name: Adan Domingo Sowa
- Nationality: Argentina
- Born: 15 August 1954 (age 72) Buenos Aires, Argentina
- Height: 5 ft 10 in (1.78 m)

Career
- Sport: Golf
- Turned professional: 1973
- Current tour: European Seniors Tour
- Professional wins: 21

Best results in major championships
- Masters Tournament: DNP
- PGA Championship: DNP
- U.S. Open: DNP
- The Open Championship: CUT: 1978, 1979, 1986

Adan Domingo Sowa (born 15 August 1954) is an Argentine professional golfer.

== Career ==
Sowa was born in Buenos Aires, and turned professional in 1973. He won the Argentine Open twice, in 1978 and 1983, and led the Argentine Professional Rankings on two occasions, in 1978 and 1982. He was second in the 1985 Argentine Open and the 1982 Argentine PGA Championship. In 1982, Sowa was second in the Jujuy Open on the Argentine Professional Tour, but claimed the first prize cheque because the overall winner was amateur, Luis Carbonetti.

Sowa played on the European Tour from 1978 to 1986, with a best finish of tied 6th in the Italian Open in 1986, on his way to 69th place on the Order of Merit. He played in the British Open three times, in 1978, 1979 and 1986.

Sowa currently competes on the European Seniors Tour. His best finish to date is second in the 2006 Seniors Tour Championship, held in Bahrain, where he lost out to Gordon J. Brand on the third hole of a playoff. That year he was 22nd on the season ending money list.

Sowa has represented Argentina in the World Cup on four occasions.

== Professional wins (21) ==
=== Argentine Tour wins (18) ===
- 1978 Metropolitan Championship, Argentine Open
- 1979 Argentine PGA Championship
- 1982 Center Open, Abierto del Litoral, Ituzaingo Grand Prix
- 1983 Abierto del Litoral (tie with Jorge Soto), SHA Grand Prix, Vanguard Grand Prix, Argentine Open
- 1984 Ford Taunnus Grand Prix, Highland Park Grand Prix
- 1985 Pinamar Open
- 1986 Punta del Este Open (Uruguay)
- 1987 San Martin Grand Prix
- 1991 North Open (tie with Eduardo Romero), Jockey Club Rosario Open
- 1992 Abierto del Litoral

=== Other wins (2) ===
- 1984 Rio de Janeiro Cup's (Brazil)
- 1988 Porto Alegre Open (Brazil)

=== Senior wins (1) ===
- 2004 Argentine Senior PGA Championship (tie with Horacio Carbonetti)

== Playoff record ==
European Seniors Tour playoff record (0–1)

No.	Year	Tournament	Opponent	Result
1	2006	Arcapita Seniors Tour Championship	(England) Gordon J. Brand	Lost to par on third extra hole

== Team appearances ==
- World Cup (representing Argentina): 1979, 1982, 1983, 1985
- Dunhill Cup (representing Argentina): 1986
