= Argentine Senior Open =

The Argentine Senior Open, or Campeonato Abierto Senior, is a senior men's professional golf tournament held in Argentina that was founded in 1987.

The first winner was 63-year-old Roberto De Vicenzo. The most successful player is Horacio Carbonetti with six victories. However, he failed to win the title at his home club, Rio Cuarto, in 2003, losing out in a play-off with Antonio Ortiz.

== Winners ==
Year	Winner	Score	Runner up
2007–08	No tournament		
2006	Armando Saavedra	219	Hugo Vizzone
2005	Horacio Carbonetti	204	Alberto Giannone
2004	No tournament		
2003	Antonio Ortiz*		Horacio Carbonetti
2002	Horacio Carbonetti	214	Antonio Ortiz
2001	Horacio Carbonetti	218	Alberto Giannone
2000	Horacio Carbonetti		
1999	Horacio Carbonetti		
1998	No tournament		
1997	Horacio Carbonetti	217	Florentino Molina
1994–96	No tournament		
1993	Florentino Molina		
1992			
1991	Florentino Molina		
1990			
1989	Juan Carlos Molina*		
1988			
1987	Roberto De Vicenzo		
