= Scott Pinckney =

American professional golfer

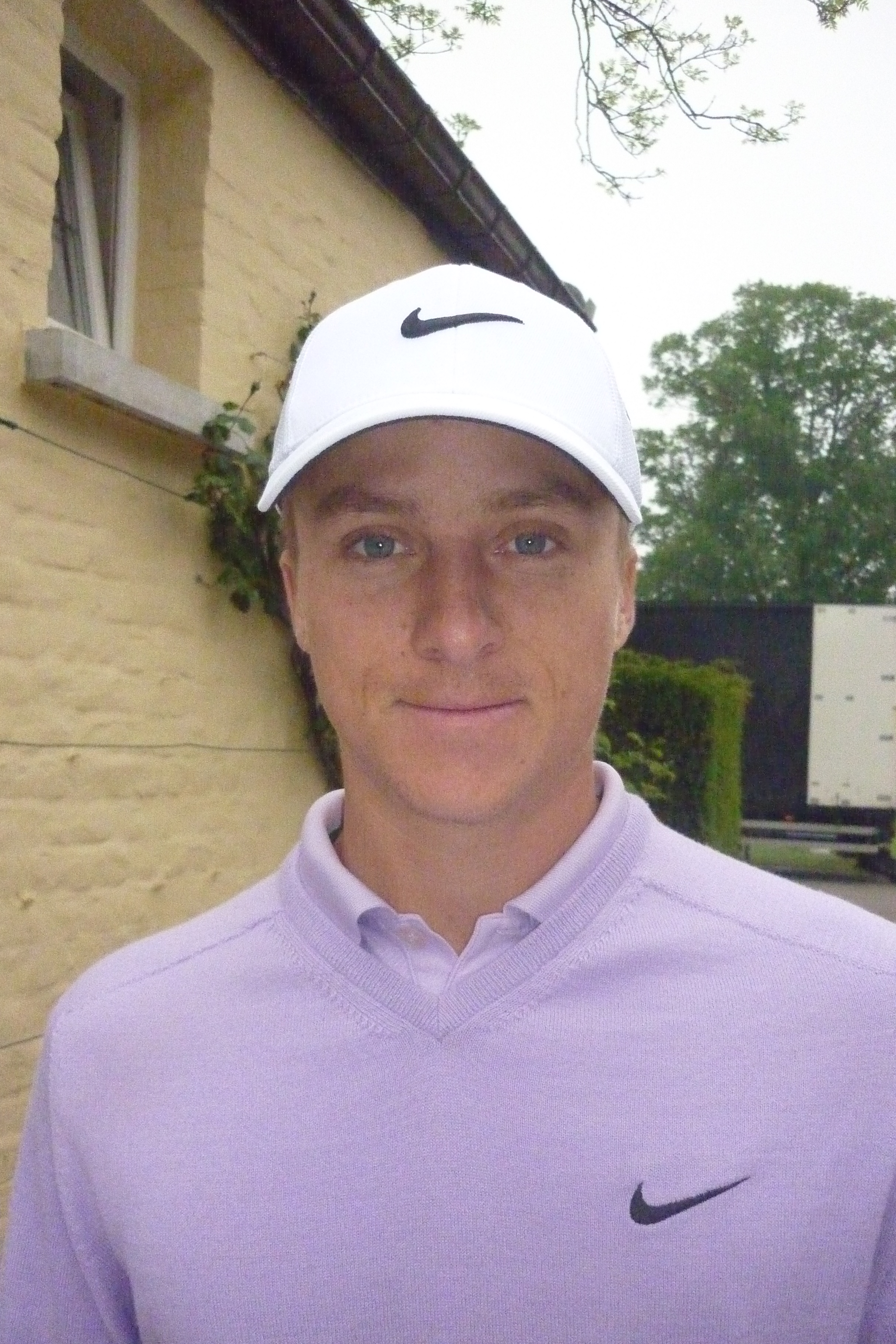
- Pinckney in 2012

Personal information
- Nationality: United States
- Born: March 13, 1989 (age 37) Orem, Utah, U.S.
- Height: 6 ft 0 in (1.83 m)
- Weight: 165 lb (75 kg; 11.8 st)

Career
- Sport: Golf
- College: Arizona State University
- Turned professional: 2011
- Former tours: PGA Tour; European Tour; Web.com Tour; Challenge Tour; Gateway Tour
- Professional wins: 1

Best results in major championships
- Masters Tournament: DNP
- PGA Championship: DNP
- U.S. Open: CUT: 2011
- The Open Championship: CUT: 2012

Scott Pinckney (born March 13, 1989) is an American professional golfer who has played on the European Tour, Challenge Tour, Web.com Tour, and PGA Tour.

== Amateur career ==
Pinckney was born in Orem, Utah. He attended Boulder Creek High School in Anthem, Arizona and then Arizona State University from 2008 to 2011. He won the 2010 Trans-Mississippi Amateur Championships at Denver Country Club after scoring a 6-under par 204 (69-66-66) and then beating Kevin Tway on the second playoff hole.

As an amateur he played in the 2011 U.S. Open after tying for top spot in sectional qualifying. He scored 79 and 75 and missed the cut.

== Professional career ==
Pinckney turned professional in July 2011. In the remainder of 2011 he played in a number of Challenge Tour events. He also played in the Nordea Masters where he finished tied for 35th and the Irish Open where he missed the cut. He finished tied for 24th in the European Tour Qualifying School and earned his card for the 2012 season. He only just made the cut after the 4th round but a last round 65 lifted him from 66th after round 5 to a final 24th.

His best result in the 2012 season was tied for 19th in the Sicilian Open. He qualified for the 2012 Open Championship through Local Final Qualifying at West Lancashire where he had a final round of 64 that included two chip-ins on his way to a 7-under par back nine. He then had to go through a playoff to secure his spot in The Open. Pinckney fired a 2-under 68 in the first round but followed up with a 7-over 77 and missed the cut.

Pinckney played on the Web.com Tour in 2014 after earning his tour card through qualifying school. He finished 13th (excluding the regular-season Top 25) in the 2014 Web.com Tour Finals to earn his PGA Tour card for the 2014–15 season.

At the 2015 AT&T Byron Nelson, Pinckney put four under-par rounds together which culminated in a final round 66 and a tied for second place in the tournament.

== Personal life ==
Pinckney is a friend of Rory McIlroy, the two having met as eight-year-olds during the Doral Junior Publix, a junior tournament held annually in Miami, Florida. Four years later Rory McIlroy stayed with the Pinckney family in Utah for three months, playing various junior events.

== Professional wins (1) ==
=== Gateway Tour wins (1) ===
- 2013 National Series 1

== Playoff record ==
Web.com Tour playoff record (0–1)

No.	Year	Tournament	Opponents	Result
1	2018	Wichita Open	(United States) Brandon Hagy, (United States) Brady Schnell	Schnell won with birdie on second extra hole Pinckney eliminated by birdie on first hole

== Results in major championships ==
Tournament	2011	2012
Masters Tournament		
U.S. Open	CUT	
The Open Championship		CUT
PGA Championship		

Did not play

CUT = missed the half-way cut

== See also ==
- 2011 European Tour Qualifying School graduates
- 2014 Web.com Tour Finals graduates
