= 2011 European Tour Qualifying School graduates =

This is a list of the 37 players who earned their 2012 European Tour card through Q School in 2011.

Place	Player	European Tour starts	Cuts made	Notes
1	(England) David Dixon	208	87	1 European Tour win
2	(England) Sam Hutsby	43	25	
3	(England) Andy Sullivan	4	1	
4	(England) Richard Bland	266	126	1 Challenge Tour win
T5	(Scotland) Steven O'Hara	223	109	
T5	(Spain) Jordi García del Moral	17	6	
7	(Norway) Knut Børsheim	0	0	
T8	(Scotland) Gary Orr	452	316	2 European Tour wins
T8	(Argentina) Emiliano Grillo	0	0	
T10	(France) Guillaume Cambis	0	0	
T10	(South Africa) Branden Grace	48	23	1 Sunshine Tour win
T12	(Sweden) Joakim Lagergren	6	2	
T12	(Denmark) Thomas Nørret	41	21	1 Challenge Tour win
T14	(England) Matthew Nixon	24	6	
T14	(Germany) Bernd Ritthammer	3	2	
T16	(South Africa) Warren Abery	57	26	7 Sunshine Tour wins
T16	(England) Lloyd Kennedy	5	1	
T16	(South Africa) Darren Fichardt	200	109	2 European Tour wins; 12 Sunshine Tour wins
T16	(France) Adrien Bernadet	6	2	
T20	(Spain) Agustín Domingo	5	2	
T20	(Sweden) Mikael Lundberg	217	101	2 European Tour wins
T20	(France) Julien Guerrier	47	17	Won the 2006 Amateur Championship
23	(Spain) Adrián Otaegui	3	0	
T24	(United States) Scott Pinckney	3	1	
T24	(South Africa) Alex Haindl	24	10	
T24	(Netherlands) Wil Besseling	32	13	1 Challenge Tour win
T24	(England) Matthew Southgate	4	2	
T24	(Sweden) Peter Gustafsson	118	57	1 Tour de las Américas win
T24	(Netherlands) Reinier Saxton	11	1	Won the 2008 Amateur Championship
T30	(Netherlands) Taco Remkes	34	8	3 Challenge Tour wins
T30	(Austria) HP Bacher	2	1	
T30	(England) Jamie Elson	89	43	1 Challenge Tour win
T30	(South Africa) Tjaart van der Walt	38	26	
T30	(Netherlands) Tim Sluiter	25	12	
T30	(England) Andrew Marshall	211	110	
T30	(Netherlands) Maarten Lafeber	363	215	1 European Tour win
T30	(France) Victor Riu	11	2	

2012 European Tour rookie

== 2012 Results ==
Player	Starts	Cuts made	Best finish	Money list rank	Earnings (€)
(England) David Dixon	16	5	T9	194	45,274
(England) Sam Hutsby	18	5	T27	206	30,910
(England) Andy Sullivan*	21	9	T14	145	120,476
(England) Richard Bland	21	13	T8	119	184,018
(Scotland) Steven O'Hara	19	8	T18	185	57,184
(Spain) Jordi García del Moral*	12	6	T33	219	24,397
(Norway) Knut Børsheim*	20	8	T11	167	82,078
(Scotland) Gary Orr	16	9	T11	159	93,350
(Argentina) Emiliano Grillo*	20	13	T5	94	255,138
(France) Guillaume Cambis*	7	1	T70	n/a	780
(South Africa) Branden Grace	26	22	Win (x4)	6	2,502,501
(Sweden) Joakim Lagergren*	17	8	T4	140	126,956
(Denmark) Thomas Nørret	19	8	T12	172	69,378
(England) Matthew Nixon	13	5	T23	191	48,253
(Germany) Bernd Ritthammer*	12	0	Cut	n/a	0
(South Africa) Warren Abery	12	3	T24	220	22,621
(England) Lloyd Kennedy*	13	4	T31	227	20,467
(South Africa) Darren Fichardt	22	12	Win	84	295,708
(France) Adrien Bernadet*	10	2	T13	240	16,525
(Spain) Agustín Domingo*	10	3	T41	257	11,280
(Sweden) Mikael Lundberg	20	9	T4	128	167,245
(France) Julien Guerrier	14	6	T11	195	45,165
(Spain) Adrián Otaegui*	11	1	T40	251	12,400
(United States) Scott Pinckney*	10	4	T19	203	34,320
(South Africa) Alex Haindl*	16	7	T16	171	71,002
(Netherlands) Wil Besseling	11	6	T4	198	40,075
(England) Matthew Southgate*	10	3	T40	239	16,618
(Sweden) Peter Gustafsson	11	2	T33	262	9,500
(Netherlands) Reinier Saxton*	14	5	T17	184	59,404
(Netherlands) Taco Remkes	10	4	T18	215	25,769
(Austria) HP Bacher*	8	2	T11	238	16,930
(England) Jamie Elson	17	8	2	124	176,186
(South Africa) Tjaart van der Walt	20	10	2	120	183,325
(Netherlands) Tim Sluiter	14	7	T11	168	78,701
(England) Andrew Marshall	18	12	T12	132	146,459
(Netherlands) Maarten Lafeber	19	13	T3	114	198,142
(France) Victor Riu*	10	4	T22	210	28,548

* European Tour rookie in 2012
T = Tied
The player retained his European Tour card for 2013 (finished inside the top 118).
The player did not retain his European Tour Tour card for 2013, but retained conditional status (finished between 119-155).
The player did not retain his European Tour card for 2013 (finished outside the top 155).

Sullivan, Orr, Lagergren, Nixon, Lundberg, and Southgate regained their cards for 2013 through Q School.

== Winners on the European Tour in 2012 ==
No.	Date	Player	Tournament	Winning score	Margin of victory	Runner(s)-up
1	15 Jan	(South Africa) Branden Grace	Joburg Open	−17 (67-66-65-72=270)	1 stroke	(England) Jamie Elson
2	22 Jan	(South Africa) Branden Grace (2)	Volvo Golf Champions	−12 (68-66-75-71=280)	Playoff	(South Africa) Ernie Els, (South Africa) Retief Goosen
3	22 Apr	(South Africa) Branden Grace (3)	Volvo China Open	−21 (67-67-64-69=277)	3 strokes	(Belgium) Nicolas Colsaerts
4	17 Jun	(South Africa) Darren Fichardt	Aa St Omer Open	−5 (68-69-69-73=279)	3 strokes	(England) Gary Lockerbie
5	7 Oct	(South Africa) Branden Grace (4)	Alfred Dunhill Links Championship	−22 (60-67-69-70=266)	2 strokes	(Denmark) Thorbjørn Olesen

== Runners-up on the European Tour in 2012 ==
No.	Date	Player	Tournament	Winner	Winning score	Runner-up score
1	8 Jan	(South Africa) Tjaart van der Walt	Africa Open	(South Africa) Louis Oosthuizen	−27 (69-62-67-67=265)	−25 (69-64-65-69=267)
2	15 Jan	(England) Jamie Elson	Joburg Open	(South Africa) Branden Grace	−17 (67-66-65-72=270)	−16 (63-75-70-63=271)

== See also ==
- 2011 Challenge Tour graduates
- 2012 European Tour
