= Victor Riu =

French professional golfer (born 1985)

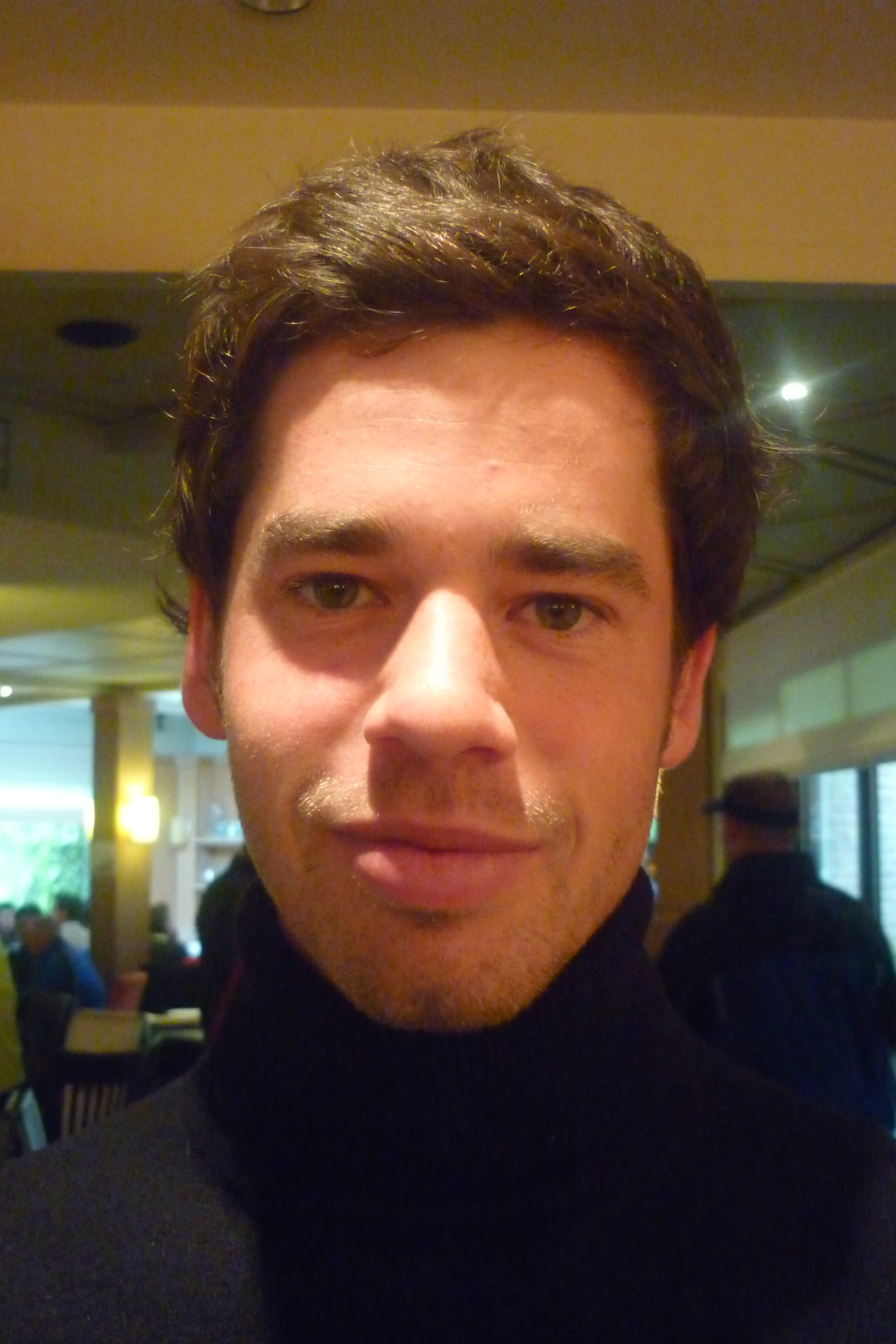

Personal information
- Nationality: France
- Born: 6 April 1985 (age 41) Paris, France
- Height: 1.83 m (6 ft 0 in)
- Weight: 76 kg (168 lb; 12.0 st)

Career
- Sport: Golf
- Turned professional: 2006
- Current tour: Challenge Tour
- Former tour: European Tour
- Professional wins: 2

Number of wins by tour
- Challenge Tour: 1
- Other: 1

Best results in major championships
- Masters Tournament: DNP
- PGA Championship: DNP
- U.S. Open: DNP
- The Open Championship: CUT: 2014

Victor Riu (born 6 April 1985) is a French professional golfer.

== Career ==
Riu began playing golf at the age of eleven and turned professional in 2006. He spent three years playing on the Alps Tour, finishing second in the order of merit in 2008 to advance to the Challenge Tour. After a further three years at that level, with two runners-up finishes and a best season of 32nd in the 2010 standings, Riu came through qualifying school at the end of 2011 to earn a place on the European Tour for the first time.

== Professional wins (2) ==
=== Challenge Tour wins (1) ===
No.	Date	Tournament	Winning score	Margin of victory	Runners-up
1	14 Jul 2013	Swiss Challenge	−19 (69-64-62-70=265)	3 strokes	(England) Adam Gee, (United States) Brinson Paolini

=== French Tour wins (1) ===
No.	Date	Tournament	Winning score	Margin of victory	Runners-up
1	11 Dec 2022	Internationaux de France Professionels de Double (with Stanislas Caturla)	−20 (62-70-61=193)	Playoff	(France) Alexandre Daydou and (France) Julien Sale

== See also ==
- 2011 European Tour Qualifying School graduates
- 2013 Challenge Tour graduates

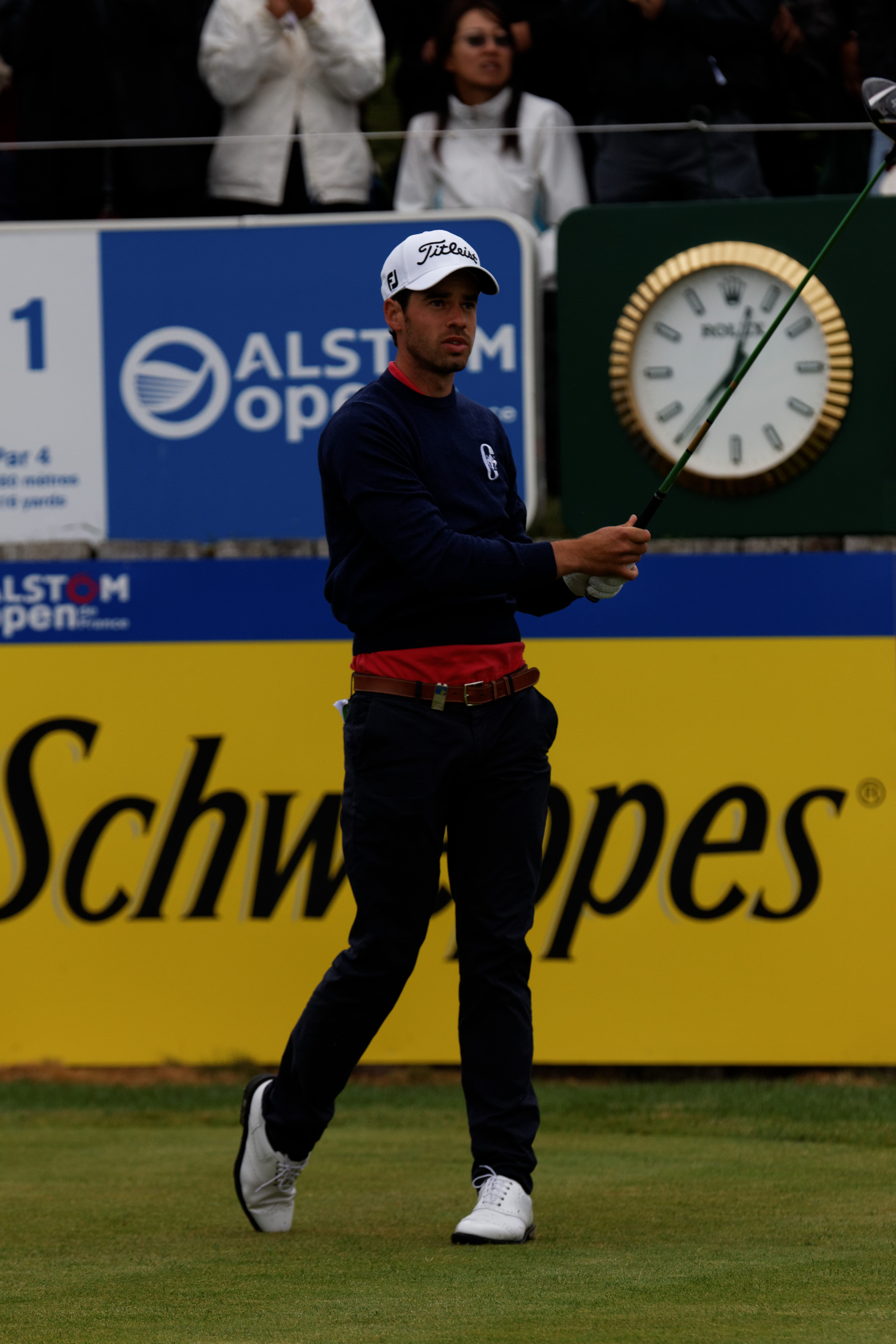
Victor Riu 02
