= Ty Capps =

American professional golfer

Personal information
- Full name: Tyler Kristopher Capps
- Nickname: Ty
- Nationality: United States
- Born: September 27, 1983 (age 43) Highlands Ranch, Colorado, U.S.
- Height: 6 ft 1 in (1.85 m)
- Weight: 175 lb (79 kg; 12.5 st)
- Spouse: Chrissie (m. 2009)

Career
- Sport: Golf
- College: University of Nebraska–Lincoln
- Turned professional: 2008
- Former tour: PGA Tour Latinoamérica
- Professional wins: 1

Tyler Kristopher Capps (born September 27, 1983) is an American professional golfer who played on PGA Tour Latinoamérica.

== Amateur career ==
Prior to turning professional in 2008, Capps represented the Nebraska Cornhuskers of the University of Nebraska–Lincoln at the collegiate level and twice qualified for the U.S. Amateur.

== Professional career ==
From 2008 to 2013, Capps played mainly played on U.S. mini-tours including the Adams Pro Tour and NGA Pro Golf Tour. For the 2014 season, Capps joined PGA Tour Latinoamérica and achieved his first win on the tour at the Roberto De Vicenzo Invitational Copa NEC on April 27, 2014, following a three-hole playoff.

== Professional wins (1) ==
=== PGA Tour Latinoamérica wins (1) ===
No.	Date	Tournament	Winning score	Margin of victory	Runner-up
1	Apr 27, 2014	Roberto De Vicenzo Invitational Copa NEC	−16 (66-67-68-71=272)	Playoff	(Argentina) Tommy Cocha
