= Mendoza Open =

Golf tournament in Argentina

The Mendoza Open, or the Western Open, was a golf tournament on the TPG Tour, the official professional golf tour in Argentina. Founded in 1939, the first two events were held at the Andino Golf Club in Mendoza, Mendoza Province. The tournament was not played again until 1956, when it was held at the Club de Campo Golf Club in Mendoza, where it has remained except for 1993 and 2009, when the tournament was again played at Andino. In 2010 was played The YPF Classic in Golf Club Andino.

== Winners ==
Year	Winner	Runner-up
2010	Mauricio Molina	Rodolfo Gonzalez, Felix Cordoba
2009	Sebastián Fernández	Martin Monguzzi, Gustavo Acosta
2008	No tournament	
2007	Rafael Echenique	Rubén Alvarez
2000–06	No tournament	
1999	Mauricio Molina	
1995–98	No tournament	
1994	José Cóceres	
1993	Armando Saavedra	
1992	Antonio Ortiz	
1991	Raúl Fretes	
1980–90	No tournament	
1979	Raul Travieso	
1978		
1977		
1976	Fidel de Luca	
1958–75	No tournament	
1957	Antonio Cerdá	
1956	Antonio Cerdá; Fidel de Luca; Romulado Barbieri	(tie)
1942–55	No tournament	
1941	Marcos Churio	
1940	Carlos Blasi	
1939	Carlos Blasi	
