= Abierto Internacional de Golf del Eje Cafetero =

Tournament information
- Location: Pereira, Colombia
- Established: 2005
- Course: CC Pereira
- Tour: Tour de las Américas
- Format: Stroke play
- Prize fund: COL$70,000,000
- Final year: 2010

Tournament record score
- Aggregate: 266 Ramón Franco (2010)
- To par: −18 Ramón Franco (2010)

Final champion
- Óscar David Álvarez

The Abierto Internacional de Golf del Eje Cafetero was an annual golf tournament held in Pereira, Colombia. It was founded in 2005 and became part of the Latin America based Tour de las Américas in 2010.

== Winners ==
Year	Winner	Score
2010	(Colombia) Óscar David Álvarez	271 (−13)
2009	(Paraguay) Ramón Franco	266 (−18)
2008	(Colombia) Juan Carlos Echeverry	271 (−13)
2007	(Ecuador) Rafael Ponce	277 (−7)
2006	(Guatemala) Alejandro Villavicencio	203 (−10)
2005	(Colombia) José Manuel Garrido	269 (−15)
