= Horacio Carbonetti =

Argentine golfer

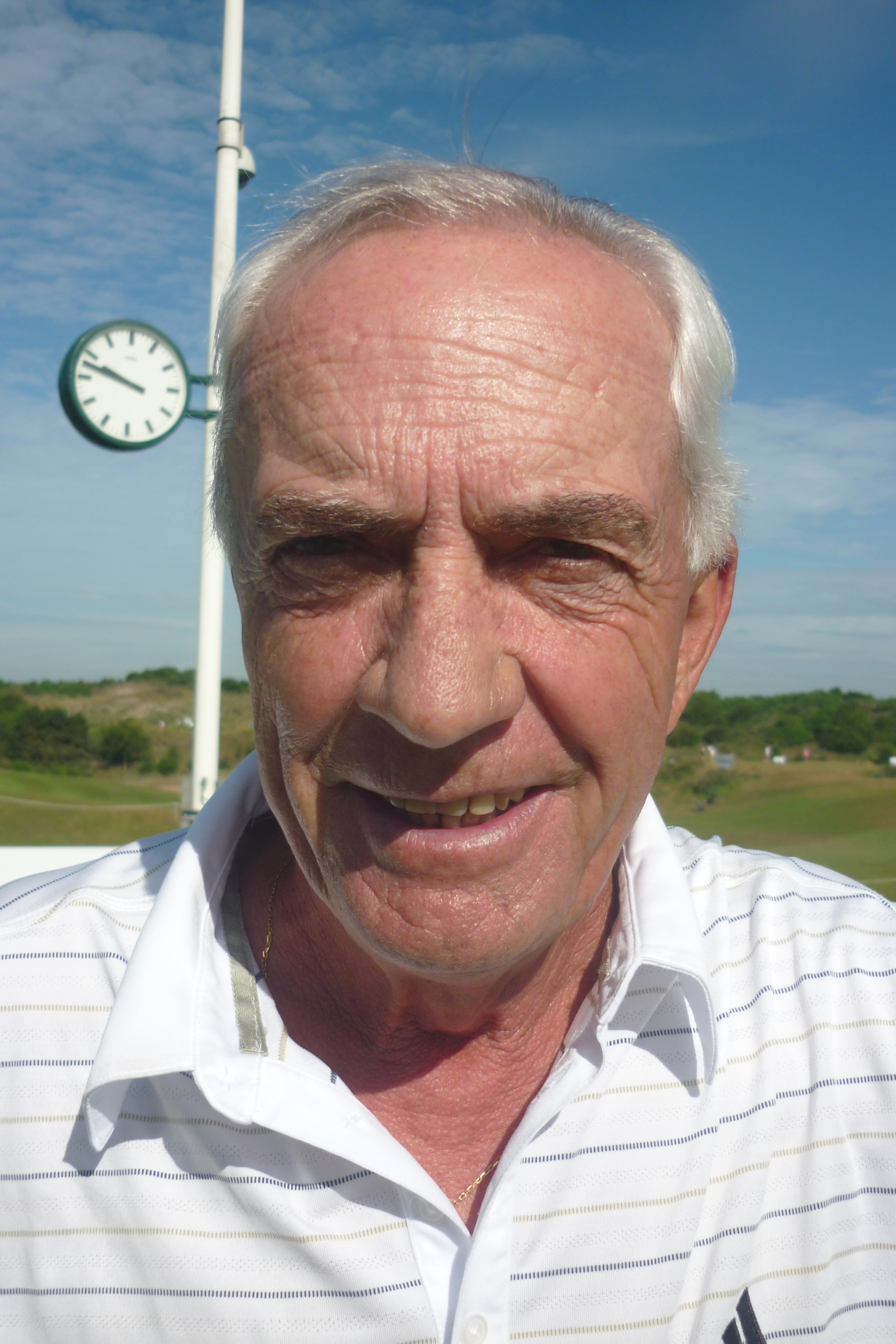

Personal information
- Full name: Horacio Carbonetti
- Nationality: Argentina
- Born: 17 November 1947 (age 78) Río Cuarto, Córdoba, Argentina
- Height: 1.75 m (5 ft 9 in)

Career
- Sport: Golf
- Turned professional: 1978
- Current tour: European Seniors Tour
- Former tour: European Tour
- Professional wins: 31

Number of wins by tour
- European Senior Tour: 2
- Other: 12 (regular); 17 (senior)

Best results in major championships
- Masters Tournament: DNP
- PGA Championship: DNP
- U.S. Open: DNP
- The Open Championship: CUT: 1980 (3rd round)

Horacio Carbonetti (born 17 November 1947) is an Argentine professional golfer.

== Early life and amateur career ==
Carbonetti was born in Río Cuarto, Córdoba. He is the brother of golfer Luis Carbonetti.

He won multiple amateur tournaments, mostly in Argentina. In 1976, he lost a playoff at the Simon Bolivar Cup Professional Championship.

== Professional career ==
In 1977, Carbonetti turned professional. In his debut tournament as a professional, Carbonetti was second at the Metropolitan Open behind Florentino Molina. In 1980, he shot a 64 in the second round of The Open Championship, at Muirfield, setting a new course record. He won the Argentine Tour Order of Merit in 1980 and the Cordoba Tour Order of Merit in 2001. He played on the European Tour from 1978 to 1981.

Carbonetti is currently a member of European Seniors Tour and has won two tournaments.

== Amateur wins ==
- 1967 Rio Cuarto Open
- 1968 La Cumbre Open
- 1969 Center Open
- 1970 Amateur Argentine Open
- 1971 Abierto del Litoral, Porto Alegre Open (Brazil)
- 1972 Porto Alegre Open (Brazil), Argentine Amateur Championship, Gordon Kenneth Cup, Luis Gestoso Grand Prix, Alvear Grand Prix
- 1973 Center Open, Quito City Open (Ecuador)
- 1974 San Pablo Open (Brazil), Luis Gestoso Grand Prix, La Cumbre Open
- 1975 Acantilados Grand Prix, Santo Domingo Open (Chile), Argentine Amateur Championship
- 1976 Simon Bolivar Cup (Venezuela), Mendoza Open, Chaco Open
- 1977 Ranelagh Open, Velox Grand Prix, Argentine Amateur Championship, Abierto del Litoral, Fultom Grand Prix

== Professional wins (31) ==
=== Argentine wins (8) ===
- 1980 Acantilados Grand Prix, Santa Teresita Open, North Open
- 1985 JPGA Championship
- 1996 Callaway Cup
- 2002 Ascochingas Tournament, Villa Mercedes Grand Prix
- 2004 Acantilados Grand Prix

=== Other wins (4) ===
- 1972 Porto Alegre Open (Brazil) (as amateur)
- 1984 Rio de Janeiro Cup's (Brazil)
- 1985 Los Leones Open (Chile)
- 1988 Cali Open (Colombia)

=== European Seniors Tour wins (2) ===
No.	Date	Tournament	Winning score	Margin of victory	Runner-up
1	10 Aug 2003	Bad Ragaz PGA Seniors Open	−13 (64-64-69=197)	3 strokes	(Australia) David Good
2	31 Jul 2004	Bad Ragaz PGA Seniors Open (2)	−15 (66-65-64=195)	Playoff	(England) Denis Durnian

European Seniors Tour playoff record (1–1)

No.	Year	Tournament	Opponent	Result
1	2004	Bad Ragaz PGA Seniors Open	(England) Denis Durnian	Won with par on first extra hole
2	2010	Sicilian Senior Open	(Spain) Domingo Hospital	Lost to par on first extra hole

=== Argentina senior wins (14) ===
- 1997 Argentine Senior Open
- 1998 Argentine Senior PGA Championship, South Senior Open
- 1999 Argentine Senior Open, La Plata Senior Grand Prix, Roberto de Vicenzo Senior Classic, Fidel De Luca Senior Classic
- 2000 Argentine Senior Open
- 2001 Argentine Senior Open
- 2002 Argentine Senior Open, Acantilados Senior Grand Prix
- 2003 Argentine Senior PGA Championship
- 2004 Argentine Senior PGA Championship (tie with Adan Sowa)
- 2005 Argentine Senior Open

=== Other senior wins (3) ===
- 1998 Seniors Classic (USA)
- 1999 Maryland Senior Open (USA)
- 2002 European Senior Tour Qualifying School (Portugal)

== Team appearances ==
Amateur

- Eisenhower Trophy (3): 1972, 1974, 1976
- South American Cup (Los Andes Cup) (9): 1969, 1970, 1971, 1972, 1973 (winners), 1974 (winners), 1975, 1976 (winners), 1977 (winners)
- Hispanidad Cup (2): 1972 (winners), 1974
- Vigil Cup (Argentine) (6): 1967, 1969, 1970, 1975 (winners), 1976 (winners), 1977 (winners)
