= SHA Grand Prix =

The SHA Grand Prix was a golf tournament on the PGA of Argentina Tour, formerly the principal professional golf tour in Argentina. The tournament has been played only seven times, the first in 1975, it has always been held at the SHA Golf Club, in Buenos Aires, Buenos Aires Province. It was last held in 2006.

== Winners ==
Year	Winner
2006	Jorge Berendt
2003–05	No tournament
2002	Raul Perez (36 holes)
1997–2001	No tournament
1996	Mauricio Molina (36 holes)
1994–95	No tournament
1993	Sebastián Fernández
1987–92	No tournament
1986	Miguel Ángel Martín
1984–85	No tournament
1983	Adan Sowa
1976–82	No tournament
1975	Juan Quinteros
