= Chile Open (golf) =

Golf tournament in Santiago, Chile

Scotiabank Abierto de Chile
Tournament information
- Location: Colina, Chile
- Established: 1927
- Course: Las Brisas de Chicureo Club de Golf
- Par: 72
- Length: 7,349 yards (6,720 m)
- Tours: PGA Tour Latinoamérica; Tour de las Américas; Chilean Tour
- Format: Stroke play
- Prize fund: US$60,000
- Month played: October

Tournament record score
- Aggregate: 264 Wil Bateman (2015)
- To par: −24 as above

Current champion
- (Chile) Joaquín Niemann

Location map
- Location in Chile

The Chile Open, or the Abierto de Chile, is a men's professional golf tournament that was first played in 1927. From 2013 through 2015 it was an event on the PGA Tour Latinoamérica. It moved to the PGA Tour Latinoamérica Developmental Series in 2016 and back to the PGA Tour Latinoamérica in 2018.

Previous winners include Gary Player, Roberto De Vicenzo and his brother Osvaldo.

== Winners ==
Year	Tour (Note: CHL − Chilean Tour; PGATLA − PGA Tour Latinoamérica; TLA − Tour de las Américas.)	Winner	Score	To par	Margin of victory	Runner(s)-up
Scotiabank Abierto de Chile
2026	CHL	(Chile) Joaquín Niemann	273	−15	4 strokes	(Chile) Gabriel Morgan-Birke
2025	CHL	(Chile) Mark Tullo (3)	278	−10	1 stroke	(Chile) Gustavo Silva
2024	CHL	(Chile) Christian Espinoza	277	−11	1 stroke	(Chile) Benjamín Alvarado (Chile) Gabriel Morgan-Birke
2023	CHL	(Chile) Agustín Errázuriz	269	−19	4 strokes	(Chile) Gabriel Morgan-Birke (Chile) Mito Pereira
Scotia Wealth Management Chile Open
2022	PGATLA	(United States) Matt Ryan	278	−10	1 stroke	(United States) Conner Godsey
2021	PGATLA	(Argentina) Alan Wagner	273	−15	1 stroke	(United States) Chandler Blanchet (Argentina) Jorge Fernández-Valdés
Itau Abierto de Chile
2020	PGATLA	No tournament due to the COVID-19 pandemic				
Abierto de Chile
2019	PGATLA	(United States) John Somers	265	−19	2 strokes	(United States) Alex Weiss
Volvo Abierto de Chile
2018	PGATLA	(United States) Jared Wolfe	270	−14	2 strokes	(Chile) Felipe Aguilar (Argentina) Estanislao Goya (Chile) Horacio León
Abierto de Chile
2017	CHL	(Chile) Felipe Aguilar (4)	279	−9	Playoff	(Chile) Mito Pereira
2016	CHL	(Chile) Felipe Aguilar (3)	266	−22	4 strokes	(Argentina) Thomas Baik
Hyundai - BBVA Abierto de Chile
2015	PGATLA	(Canada) Wil Bateman	264	−24	1 stroke	(Puerto Rico) Rafael Campos
2014	PGATLA	(Argentina) Jorge Fernández-Valdés	271	−17	2 strokes	(United States) Joel Dahmen (Mexico) Armando Favela
Chile Open
2013	PGATLA	(United States) Timothy O'Neal	275	−13	Playoff	(United States) Ryan Blaum (Argentina) Sebastián Saavedra
Abierto de Chile
2012		(Argentina) Mauricio Molina	273	−15	1 stroke	(Chile) Benjamín Alvarado
2011	TLA	(Chile) Benjamín Alvarado (2)	266	−22	8 strokes	(Argentina) Mauricio Molina (Argentina) Sebastián Saavedra
2010	TLA	(Argentina) Gustavo Acosta	282	−6	Playoff	(Venezuela) Wolmer Murillo
Abierto de Chile Copa BCI
2009	TLA	(Argentina) Agustín Jauretche	279	−9	2 strokes	(Argentina) Paulo Pinto
Abierto de Chile
2008	TLA	(Chile) Felipe Aguilar (2)	265	−23	11 strokes	(Argentina) Sebastián Saavedra
2007	TLA	(Chile) Ángel Fernández	279	−9	2 strokes	(Chile) Felipe Aguilar
2006		(Chile) Mark Tullo (2)				
2005		(Chile) Mark Tullo				
2004		(Chile) Roy Mackenzie (3)				
2003		(Chile) Benjamín Alvarado (a)				
2002		(Chile) Felipe Aguilar				
Chile Open
2001		(Chile) Guillermo Encina (5)				
2000		(Chile) Cristián León				
1999		(Chile) Guillermo Encina (4)				
1998		(Chile) Roy Mackenzie (2)				
1997		(Chile) Ignacio Basagoitía (a)				
1996		(Argentina) Ricardo González				
1995		(Chile) Gabriel Morgan S. (a)				
1994		(Paraguay) Raúl Fretes				
1993		(Chile) Francisco Cerda				
1992		(Chile) Juan E. Labbé (a)				
1991		(Chile) Guillermo Encina (3)				
1990		(Chile) Guillermo Encina (2)				
1989		(Chile) Roy Mackenzie (a)				
1988		(Chile) Guillermo Encina				
1987		(Chile) Hugo León B. (a)				
1986		(Chile) Luis Torres				
1985		(Paraguay) Carlos Franco				
1984		(Argentina) Eduardo Romero				
1983		(Chile) Felipe Taverne				
1982: No tournament
1981		(United States) John Hamarik	281	−7		
1980		(South Africa) Gary Player	284	−4	1 stroke	(United States) Alan Pate
1979		(Venezuela) Ramón Muñóz				
1978		(Chile) Francisco Cerda (7)				
1977		(Chile) Andrés Morales (a)				
1976		(Chile) Michael Grasty (a)				
1975		(Chile) William Pérez (a)				
1974		(Chile) Francisco Cerda (6)				
1973		(Chile) Francisco Cerda (5)				
1972		(Chile) Rafael Jerez (2)				
1971		(Chile) Rafael Jerez				
1970		(Chile) Patricio Pino				
1969		(Chile) Francisco Cerda (4)				
1968		(Chile) Mauricio Galeno V. (a)				
1967		(Chile) Francisco Cerda (3)				
1966		(Chile) Francisco Cerda (2)				
1965		(Chile) Francisco Cerda				
1964		(Chile) Anisio Araya				
1963		(Chile) Enrique Orellana (2)				
1962		(Chile) Arturo Mori (8)				
1961		(Argentina) Roberto De Vicenzo				
1960		(Chile) Enrique Orellana				
1959: No tournament
1958		(Chile) Manuel Morales				
1957		(Chile) Luciano Calderón (6)				
1956: No tournament
1955		(Chile) Guy Barroilhet (a)				
1954		(Argentina) Osvaldo De Vicenzo (3)				
1953		(Argentina) Osvaldo De Vicenzo (2)				
1952		(Argentina) Osvaldo De Vicenzo				
1951		(Chile) Alberto Salas				
1951		(Chile) Luciano Calderón (5)				
1950		(Chile) Luciano Calderón (4)				
1949		(Chile) Luciano Calderón (3)				
1948		(Chile) Luis Salas				
1947		(Chile) Emilo Palacios				
1946		(Argentina) Enrique Bertolino (Argentina) Roberto De Vicenzo			Title shared	
1945		(Chile) Francisco Baena				
1944		(Argentina) Luis A. Herrera (a)				
1943		(Chile) Luciano Calderón (2)				
1942		(Chile) Justo Vega (3)				
1941		(Chile) Justo Vega (2)				
1940		(Chile) Justo Vega				
1939		(Chile) Luciano Calderón				
1938		(Chile) Luis Reyes				
1937		(Chile) Arturo Mori (7)				
1936		(Chile) W. V. Simson (a)				
1935		(Argentina) Eduardo Blasi				
1934		(Argentina) Arturo Mori (6)				
1933		(Argentina) Arturo Mori (5)				
1932		(Argentina) Arturo Mori (4)				
1931		(Argentina) Pedro Silva (2)				
1930		(Argentina) Pedro Silva				
1929		(Argentina) Arturo Mori (3)				
1928		(Argentina) Arturo Mori (2)				
1927		(Argentina) Arturo Mori				

== See also ==
- Open golf tournament
