= Nate Smith (golfer) =

American golfer (born 1983)

Personal information
- Full name: Nathan J. Smith
- Nationality: United States
- Born: August 7, 1983 (age 43) Santa Monica, California, U.S.
- Height: 6 ft 2 in (1.88 m)
- Weight: 175 lb (79 kg; 12.5 st)

Career
- Sport: Golf
- College: Duke University
- Turned professional: 2006
- Reinstated amateur: 2022
- Former tours: PGA Tour; Web.com Tour; Challenge Tour; NGA Hooters Tour
- Professional wins: 2

Number of wins by tour
- Korn Ferry Tour: 1
- Other: 1

Nathan J. Smith (born August 7, 1983) is an American amateur golfer

== Early life and amateur career ==
Smith was born in Santa Monica, California. He played at Soquel High and transferred to Stevenson School in Pebble Beach, where he also played golf two seasons. He played college golf at Duke University where he was a two-time All-American.

== Professional career ==
In 2006, he turned professional. Smith played on the mini-tours from 2006 to 2008. He joined the Challenge Tour in 2009 via qualifying school. He joined the Nationwide Tour in 2010 and won his first title in September at the WNB Golf Classic.

Smith just missed out on an automatic PGA Tour card, finishing 27th on the 2010 Nationwide Tour. He later earned his card through qualifying school.

Smith was reinstated as an amateur in 2022.

== Professional wins (2) ==
=== Nationwide Tour wins (1) ===
No.	Date	Tournament	Winning score	Margin of victory	Runners-up
1	Sep 26, 2010	WNB Golf Classic	−18 (67-70-67-66=270)	2 strokes	(Argentina) Fabián Gómez, (United States) Brandt Jobe, (Australia) Alistair Presnell

=== NGA Hooters Tour wins (1) ===
No.	Date	Tournament	Winning score	Margin of victory	Runner-up
1	Apr 22, 2007	Capitol Chevrolet Classic	−18 (71-67-65-67=270)	1 stroke	(United States) Kris Blanks

== See also ==
- 2010 PGA Tour Qualifying School graduates
