= Rubén Alvarez =

Argentine golfer

Personal information
- Full name: Rubén Alvarez
- Nationality: Argentina
- Born: 30 May 1961 Zárate, Buenos Aires, Argentina
- Died: 9 November 2014 (aged 53)

Career
- Sport: Golf
- Turned professional: 1986
- Former tour: Tour de las Americas
- Professional wins: 19

Best results in major championships
- Masters Tournament: DNP
- PGA Championship: DNP
- U.S. Open: DNP
- The Open Championship: T67: 1994

Achievements and awards
- Argentine Tour Ranking winner: 1991

Rubén Alvarez (30 May 1961 – 9 November 2014) was an Argentine professional golfer.

== Early life ==
Alvarez was born in Zárate, Buenos Aires. In his early career, he worked as a caddie in Buenos Aires,

== Professional career ==
In 1986, Alvarez turned professional. He won the Argentine Qualifying School in 1986 and went on to win the Argentine Tour Ranking (Order of Merit) in 1991. He competed once in a major championships, the 1994 Open Championship. He competed on the Challenge Tour in 1991, with a best of two second-place finishes, the Ramlösa Open and the Jede Hot Cup, both held in Sweden. He competed on the European Tour from 1993 to 1995, and had two top ten finishes, coming 9th in both the 1994 Tenerife Open and the 1995 Madeira Island Open.

Alvarez represented Argentina on two occasions in the World Cup, 1991 in Rome, Italy and 1992 in Madrid, Spain. He was second in the San Pablo Open (Brazil) in 1990.

== Personal life ==
Alvarez died of cancer in 2014.

== Professional wins (19) ==
=== Argentine wins (18) ===
- 1991 Pinamar Open, South Open, Acantilados Grand Prix, Norpatagonico Open, Praderas Grand Prix
- 1992 Boulonge Four Ball, La Orquidea Grand Prix, Hindu Club Grand Prix, Martindale Grand Prix, Los Pinguinos Grand Prix
- 1993 Praderas Grand Prix
- 1995 Argentine PGA Championship, Norpatagonico Open
- 1998 Parana Open
- 1999 Praderas Grand Prix
- 2000 Metropolitano Open
- 2003 South Open
- 2004 Smithfield Club Grand Prix

=== Other wins (1) ===
- 1991 La Deheza Grand Prix (Chile)

== Team appearances ==
- World Cup (representing Argentina): 1991, 1992
