= Florentino Molina =

Argentine golfer

Personal information
- Full name: Florentino Molina
- Nationality: Argentina
- Born: 30 December 1938 (age 87) Río Cuarto, Córdoba, Argentina

Career
- Sport: Golf
- Turned professional: 1960
- Former tours: PGA Tour; European Tour
- Professional wins: 63

Best results in major championships
- Masters Tournament: DNP
- PGA Championship: DNP
- U.S. Open: T39: 1977
- The Open Championship: T32: 1970

Florentino Molina (born 30 December 1938) is an Argentine professional golfer.

== Career ==
In 1938, Molina was born in Río Cuarto, Córdoba.

In 1960, Molina turned pro. He won the Argentine Open five times and the Argentine Professional Rankings four times. He played on the PGA Tour from 1975 to 1980 and the European Tour in 1981. He was second in French Open in 1970 and 4th in the B.C. Open in 1977. He was second in Argentine Open in 1962 and the Brazil Open in 1970.

Molina played in the British Open five times: in 1970, 1971, 1974, 1978, and 1981. He also played in the 1977 U.S. Open where he was one of seven players tied for the lead after the first round.

In 2000, Molina was second in Miramar Grand Prix (TPG Tour) at the age of 61.

== Professional wins ==
=== Canadian Tour wins (2) ===
- 1974 Atlantic Open
- 1975 Pine Tree Open

=== Argentine Tour wins (45) ===
- 1961 San Isidro Grand Prix
- 1962 La Cumbre Open
- 1963 La Cumbre Open, Acantilados Grand Prix, Necochea Grand Prix, Lincoln Grand Prix
- 1964 Sierra de los Padres Grand Prix, Buenos Aires Invitational Grand Prix
- 1966 La Cumbre Open
- 1967 Jockey Club Rosario Open
- 1970 Lomas Open, Palermo Grand Prix, Argentine PGA Championship
- 1971 Argentine Open, Center Open, Norpatagonico Open, San Martin Grand Prix
- 1973 Argentine Open
- 1975 Argentine Open, Abierto del Litoral, Acantilados Grand Prix
- 1976 Argentine Open, Fultom Grand Prix
- 1977 Argentine Open, Argentine Masters, Abierto del Litoral, Metropolitano Open, Rio Cuarto Open, Lomas Open
- 1978 Rio Cuarto Open
- 1979 Metropolitano Open
- 1980 Ituzaingo Grand Prix
- 1981 Center Open, Praderas Grand Prix, Metropolitano Open
- 1982 Acantilados Grand Prix, Ford Taunus Grand Prix
- 1983 San Martin Grand Prix, Pinamar Open
- 1984 Argentino Grand Prix, Lomas Pro-Am (with Miguel Prado)
- 1985 South Open, Carilo Grand Prix, La Cumbre Open
- 1986 Boulonge Grand Prix

=== South American wins (7) ===
- 1964 Santo Domingo Open (Chile), Lima Open (Peru)
- 1965 Uruguay Open
- 1967 Peru Open
- 1970 Ford Maracaibo Open
- 1973 Bogota Open (Colombia)
- 1974 Ford Maracaibo Open

=== Senior wins (9) ===
- 1991 Argentine Senior Open, Argentine Senior PGA Championship
- 1992 Argentine Senior PGA Championship
- 1993 Uruguay Senior Open, Argentine Senior Open
- 1994 Metropolitano Senior Open
- 1995 Argentine Senior PGA Championship, Acantilados Senior Grand Prix
- 1999 Acantilados Senior Grand Prix

== Team appearances ==
- World Cup (representing Argentina): 1967, 1971, 1978, 1982

== See also ==
- 1974 PGA Tour Qualifying School graduates
