= Armando Saavedra =

Argentine professional golfer (born 1954)

Personal information
- Full name: Armando Saavedra
- Nationality: Argentina
- Born: 27 September 1954 (age 72) Chile
- Height: 5 ft 10 in (1.78 m)
- Children: 4

Career
- Sport: Golf
- Turned professional: 1974
- Former tours: European Tour; European Seniors Tour
- Professional wins: 31

Best results in major championships
- Masters Tournament: DNP
- PGA Championship: DNP
- U.S. Open: DNP
- The Open Championship: T30: 1979

Armando Saavedra (born 27 September 1954) is an Argentine professional golfer.

== Early life ==
In 1954, Saavedra was born in Chile. In his adolescence, he worked as a caddie in Buenos Aires.

== Professional career ==
In 1974, Saavedra turning professional. Saavedra won the Argentine Professional Ranking in 1979, but only competed in four major championships, in the British Open in 1979, 1980, 1985 and 1990. He competed on the European Tour from 1978 to 1979 and from 1985 to 1992 and obtained three top ten finishes: T8 at the Scandinavian Enterprise Open in 1979, T5 at the Peugeot Open de France in 1986 and 7th at the Open Renault de Baleares in 1990. He competed on the Canadian Tour in 1979 and his best finish was third in the Canadian PGA Championship.

In 1985, Saavedra lost in a playoff at the Kentab Open (Sweden).

Saavedra represented Argentina on one occasion in the World Cup in 1987 and finished fourth in the individual competition in Hawaii. He also represented Argentina in the Alfred Dunhill Cup in 1986.

After turning 50, Saavedra competed on the European Seniors Tour in 2005.

== Professional wins (31) ==
=== Argentine wins (22) ===
- 1978 Chaco Open, Jujuy Open
- 1979 International Bank Grand Prix, Ranelagh Open, La Razon Cup
- 1982 South Open, Praderas Grand Prix (tie with Vicente Fernández)
- 1984 San Isidro Open
- 1985 Acantilados Grand Prix, Abierto del Litoral, Vanguard Grand Prix
- 1986 Abierto del Litoral, Ranelagh Open
- 1987 Chaco Open, South American Team
- 1992 Palermo Grand Prix, Golfer's Grand Prix, Campeonato Metropolitano
- 1993 Mendoza Open
- 1994 Argentine PGA Championship
- 1997 La Plata Open, Abierto del Litoral

=== Other wins (4) ===
- 1986 Iguazu International Open (Paraguay)
- 1987 São Paulo Open (Brazil)
- 1992 Colombian Open
- 2001 Santo Domingo Open (Chile)

=== Senior wins (5) ===
- 2006 Argentine Senior Open, Chaco Senior Open, Jockey Club Rosario Senior Open
- 2007 Rafaela Senior Grand Prix
- 2009 Acantilados Senior Open

== Team appearances ==
- Dunhill Cup (representing Argentina): 1986
- World Cup (representing Argentina): 1987
