= Nelson Ledesma =

Argentinian golfer

Personal information
- Full name: Nelson Lautaro Ledesma
- Nationality: Argentina
- Born: 25 July 1990 (age 36) Tucumán, Argentina
- Height: 5 ft 10 in (1.78 m)
- Weight: 211 lb (96 kg; 15.1 st)

Career
- Sport: Golf
- Turned professional: 2007
- Current tour: Korn Ferry Tour
- Former tours: PGA Tour; PGA Tour Latinoamérica
- Professional wins: 11

Number of wins by tour
- Korn Ferry Tour: 2
- Other: 9

Achievements and awards
- TPG Tour Order of Merit winner: 2014, 2023

Nelson Lautaro Ledesma (born 25 July 1990) is an Argentinian professional golfer who currently plays on PGA Tour. He has won twice on the Korn Ferry Tour.

== Professional career ==
Ledesma turned professional in 2007 and played much of his early career on the Argentine national professional golf tour, winning the Order of Merit in 2014, the Tour de las Américas and the PGA Tour Latinoamérica. He gained his card on the second tier United States based Web.com Tour for the 2018 season after finishing 5th on the PGA Tour Latinoamérica Order of Merit in 2017.

Ledesma won on his debut season on the Web.com Tour at the LECOM Health Challenge. This was his only top-10 finish of the season and he finished 42nd in the money list. He claimed his second victory on the renamed Korn Ferry Tour the following year at the TPC Colorado Championship, and finished the season in 8th place on the regular season points list to earn his card on the PGA Tour for the 2019–20 season.

== Professional wins (11) ==
=== Korn Ferry Tour wins (2) ===
No.	Date	Tournament	Winning score	Margin of victory	Runner(s)-up
1	8 Jul 2018	LECOM Health Challenge	−22 (68-67-64-67=266)	2 strokes	(United States) Kyle Jones, (Colombia) Sebastián Muñoz
2	14 Jul 2019	TPC Colorado Championship	−15 (65-69-69-70=273)	1 stroke	(Australia) Brett Coletta

=== PGA Tour Latinoamérica wins (1) ===
No.	Date	Tournament	Winning score	Margin of victory	Runners-up
1	23 Apr 2017	Abierto OSDE del Centro	−9 (68-69-67-71=275)	3 strokes	(United States) Hank Lebioda, (Argentina) Paulo Pinto

=== Tour de las Américas wins (1) ===
No.	Date	Tournament	Winning score	Margin of victory	Runners-up
1	20 Nov 2011	Roberto De Vicenzo Classic^{1}	−8 (71-71-69-69=280)	Playoff	(Argentina) Rafael Gómez, (Argentina) Fernando Zacarias

^{1}Co-sanctioned by the TPG Tour

=== TPG Tour wins (7) ===
No.	Date	Tournament	Winning score	Margin of victory	Runner(s)-up
1	18 Jun 2011	Abierto Termas de Río Hondo	−25 (64-68-66-65=263)	4 strokes	(Argentina) Andrés Romero
2	20 Nov 2011	Roberto De Vicenzo Classic^{1}	−8 (71-71-69-69=280)	Playoff	(Argentina) Rafael Gómez, (Argentina) Fernando Zacarias
3	17 Nov 2013	Gran Premio Las Praderas	−11 (70-70-67-70=277)	4 strokes	(Argentina) Rafael Gómez
4	11 Jan 2014	Abierto del Sur	−12 (64-66-70-68=268)	1 stroke	(Argentina) Emilio Domínguez
5	8 Jun 2014	Abierto Termas de Río Hondo (2)	−20 (67-69-65-67=268)	1 stroke	(Argentina) Gustavo Acosta, (Argentina) Maximiliano Godoy, (Argentina) Jorge Monroy
6	8 Apr 2023	Abierto del Centro	−14 (69-68-72-71=270)	1 stroke	(Argentina) Ignacio Marino
7	9 Sep 2023	Abierto del Norte	−20 (65-71-65-63=264)	Playoff	(Argentina) Mauro Báez

^{1}Co-sanctioned by the Tour de las Américas

=== Ángel Cabrera Tour wins (1) ===
No.	Date	Tournament	Winning score	Margin of victory	Runner-up
1	20 Aug 2016	Ángel Cabrera Tour Grand Final	−3 (70-71=141)	3 strokes	(Australia) Ryan McCarthy

== Team appearances ==
Professional

- Aruba Cup (representing PGA Tour Latinoamérica): 2017

== See also ==
- 2019 Korn Ferry Tour Finals graduates
