= Sebastián Fernández (golfer) =

Argentine professional golfer

Personal information
- Full name: Sebastián Fernández
- Nationality: Argentina
- Born: 8 September 1973 (age 53) Buenos Aires, Argentina
- Height: 1.80 m (5 ft 11 in)
- Weight: 96 kg (212 lb; 15.1 st)
- Spouse: Carina
- Children: 3

Career
- Sport: Golf
- Turned professional: 1990
- Former tours: European Tour; Nationwide Tour; PGA Tour Latinoamérica; Tour de las Américas; TPG Tour
- Professional wins: 20

Number of wins by tour
- Challenge Tour: 1
- Other: 19

Sebastián Fernández (born 8 September 1973) is an Argentine professional golfer.

== Career ==
Fernández was born in Buenos Aires. He worked as a caddie in Buenos Aires, before turning professional in 1991. He won the Argentine Tour Order of Merit in 2000. He won three Argentine PGA Championships, in 1991, 2001 and 2005, the first as an 18-year-old, and also came second in 2003.

Fernández competed on the Challenge Tour from 2003 to 2007, winning one tournament, the Costa Rica Open in 2003, and finishing second in the Skandia PGA Open (Sweden) in 2003, the Costa Rica Open in 2005 and the Challenge of Ireland in 2006.

Seventh place on the Challenge Tour Order of Merit in 2003 enabled Fernández to play on the European Tour the following year. He managed a best finish of 16th position in the BMW International Open, and just missed out on retaining his tour card, ending the season 136th on the money list. In 2008 he played on the Nationwide Tour, achieving a best of 5th place in the New Zealand PGA Championship.

== Professional wins (20) ==
=== Challenge Tour wins (1) ===
No.	Date	Tournament	Winning score	Margin of victory	Runner-up
1	2 Feb 2003	Credomatic MasterCard Costa Rica Open^{1}	−6 (70-68-69-71=278)	Playoff	(Argentina) César Monasterio

^{1}Co-sanctioned by the Tour de las Américas

Challenge Tour playoff record (1–1)

No.	Year	Tournament	Opponent	Result
1	2003	Credomatic MasterCard Costa Rica Open	(Argentina) César Monasterio	Won with par on first extra hole
2	2005	American Express Costa Rica Open	(United States) Kyle Dobbs	Lost to birdie on first extra hole

=== PGA Tour Latinoamérica wins (1) ===
No.	Date	Tournament	Winning score	Margin of victory	Runner-up
1	2 Dec 2012	Arturo Calle Colombian Coffee Classic	−9 (68-69-68-70=275)	Playoff	(Colombia) Jose Manuel Garrido

=== Tour de las Américas wins (3) ===
No.	Date	Tournament	Winning score	Margin of victory	Runner-up
1	24 Feb 2002	Tikal Trophy Guatemala Open	−10 (68-71-69-70=278)	3 strokes	(Argentina) Pablo Del Grosso
2	2 Feb 2003	Credomatic MasterCard Costa Rica Open^{1}	−6 (70-68-69-71=278)	Playoff	(Argentina) César Monasterio
3	30 May 2010	Toyota Peru Open	−22 (65-63-70-68=266)	7 strokes	(Chile) Cristian Espinoza
4	31 Oct 2010	Carlos Franco Invitational^{1}	−10 (68-72-70-68=278)	3 strokes	(Paraguay) Héctor Céspedes

^{1}Co-sanctioned by the TPG Tour

=== TPG Tour wins (3) ===
No.	Date	Tournament	Winning score	Margin of victory	Runner-up
1	31 Oct 2010	Carlos Franco Invitational^{1}	−10 (68-72-70-68=278)	3 strokes	(Paraguay) Héctor Céspedes
2	26 Nov 2011	Argentine PGA Championship	−19 (67-64-63-71=265)	4 strokes	(Argentina) Andrés Romero
3	26 Oct 2013	Andrés Romero Invitational	−22 (63-65-66-68=262)	1 stroke	(Argentina) César Costilla

^{1}Co-sanctioned by the Tour de las Américas

=== Argentine wins (12) ===
- 1991 Argentine PGA Championship
- 1992 Ituzaingo Grand Prix, Nautico Hacoaj Grand Prix
- 1993 SHA Grand Prix
- 1995 Pinamar Open
- 1998 Las Delicias Grand Prix
- 2000 Praderas Grand Prix, Bariloche Grand Prix, Acantilados Grand Prix
- 2001 Argentine PGA Championship
- 2005 Argentine PGA Championship
- 2009 YPF Classic Mendoza Open

=== Other wins (1) ===
- 1996 Carmel Open (Colombia)
