= Carlos Franco Invitational =

Golf tournament held in Paraguay

The Carlos Franco Invitational is a professional golf tournament held at the Carlos Franco Country & Golf Club, in Arroyos y Esteros, Paraguay. First held in 2004, the tournament was included in the TPG Tour schedule in 2007, which is the official professional golf tour in Argentina. The following year, it was also included on the Tour de las Americas calendar, the highest level tour in Latin America.

== Winners ==
Year	Winner	Score	Runner-up
2014	(Argentina) Andrés Romero	271 (−11)	Carlos Franco
2013	(Argentina) Daniel Barbetti		
2012	(Paraguay) Ángel Franco		
2011	(Paraguay) Fabrizio Zanotti	270 (−14)	Leandro Marelli
2010	(Argentina) Sebastián Fernández	278 (−10)	Hector Cespedes
2009	(Argentina) Agustín Jauretche	280 (−8)	Rodolfo González, Fabrizio Zanotti
2008	(Argentina) Clodomiro Carranza	280 (−8)^{PO}	César Monasterio
2007	(Paraguay) Marco Ruiz	279 (−9)	Ángel Franco
2006	(Colombia) Diego Vanegas	206 (-10)	(Colombia) Rodrigo Castañeda, (Colombia) Alvaro Pinedo
2005	(Paraguay) Raúl Fretes	209	Pedro Martínez, Nilson Cabrera
2004	(Argentina) Daniel Barbetti		

^{PO} – won following playoff
