= 2014 Swedish Golf Tour =

Golf tour season

2014 Swedish Golf Tour season
- Duration: 24 February 2014 – 11 October 2014
- Number of official events: 19
- Order of Merit: (Sweden) Jesper Billing

The 2014 Swedish Golf Tour, titled as the 2014 Nordea Tour for sponsorship reasons, was the 31st season of the Swedish Golf Tour, the main professional golf tour in Sweden since it was formed in 1984, with most tournaments being incorporated into the Nordic Golf League since 1999.

== Schedule ==
The following table lists official events during the 2014 season.

Date	Tournament	Location	Purse (SKr)	Winner (Note: The number in brackets after each winner's name is the number of Swedish Golf Tour events they had won up to and including that tournament. As most Swedish Golf Tour events are incorporated into the Nordic Golf League schedule, details of these wins are displayed there instead.)	Main tour (Note: NGL − Nordic Golf League.)
26 Feb	Winter Series Lakes Open	Spain	€45,000	(Denmark) Rasmus Hjelm Nielsen	NGL
2 Mar	Winter Series Hills Open	Spain	€45,000	(Denmark) Lars Johansen	NGL
5 Apr	Black Mountain Invitational	Thailand	416,000	(Sweden) Björn Hellgren (1)	
10 May	Bravo Tours Open	Denmark	DKr 300,000	(Sweden) Christopher Feldborg Nielsen	NGL
18 May	Stora Hotellet Bryggan Fjällbacka Open	Bohuslän	400,000	(Sweden) Jesper Billing	NGL
25 May	Landskrona Masters PGA Championship	Skåne	400,000	(Sweden) Fredrik Gustavsson	NGL
14 Jun	Wisby Open	Gotland	400,000	(Sweden) Jesper Billing	NGL
19 Jun	Nordea Challenge	Norway	€40,000	(Norway) Elias Bertheussen	NGL
4 Jul	Katrineholm Open	Södermanland	400,000	(Sweden) Jesper Billing	NGL
12 Jul	Gant Open	Finland	€40,000	(Denmark) Christian Gloet	NGL
3 Aug	Made in Denmark European Tour Qualifier	Germany	€50,000	(Sweden) Jesper Gaardsdal	NGL
9 Aug	Isaberg Open	Småland	350,000	(Sweden) Daniel Jennevret	NGL
15 Aug	SM Match	Uppland	400,000	(Denmark) Patrick O'Neill	NGL
24 Aug	Landeryd Masters	Östergötland	435,000	(Sweden) Henric Sturehed	NGL
13 Sep	Haverdal Open	Halland	350,000	(Sweden) Jacob Glennemo	NGL
19 Sep	Kitchen Joy Championship	Denmark	DKr 300,000	(Sweden) Jesper Billing	NGL
27 Sep	Lindahl Masters	Halland	400,000	(Sweden) Sebastian Hansson	NGL
4 Oct	Race to HimmerLand	Denmark	DKr 450,000	(Sweden) Jacob Glennemo	NGL
11 Oct	Tourfinal Svedala Open	Skåne	450,000	(Denmark) Mads Søgaard	NGL

== Order of Merit ==
The Order of Merit was titled as the Nordea Tour Ranking and was based on tournament results during the season, calculated using a points-based system.

Position	Player	Points
1	(Sweden) Jesper Billing	423,377
2	(Sweden) Jacob Glennemo	407,052
3	(Sweden) Steven Jeppesen	212,406
4	(Norway) Elias Bertheussen	205,610
5	(Sweden) Björn Hellgren	203,578

== See also ==
- 2014 Danish Golf Tour
- 2014 Swedish Golf Tour (women)
