= Danish Golf Tour seasons =

This page lists all Danish Golf Tour (currently titled as the ECCO Tour for sponsorship reasons) seasons from its inaugural season in 2003.

Since its inception, the majority of tournaments on the Danish Golf Tour schedule are incorporated into the Nordic Golf League, one of the third-tier tours recognised by the European Tour.

== 2026 season ==
=== Schedule ===
The following table lists official events during the 2026 season.

Date	Tournament	Location	Purse (€)	Winner (Note: The number in brackets after each winner's name is the number of Danish Golf Tour events they had won up to and including that tournament. As most Danish Golf Tour events are incorporated into the Nordic Golf League schedule, details of these wins are displayed there instead.)	Main tour (Note: NGL − Nordic Golf League.)
25 Feb	Infinitum ECCO Masters	Spain	50,000	(Denmark) Martin Simonsen	NGL
1 Mar	Infinitum Championship	Spain	50,000	(Norway) Mats Ege	NGL
5 Mar	Infinitum Spring Series Final	Spain	50,000	(Finland) Lauri Ruuska	NGL
11 Apr	Sand Valley Open	Poland	50,000	(Sweden) Albin Tidén	NGL
15 Apr	ECCO Tour Sand Valley Masters	Poland	50,000	(Scotland) Eric McIntosh	NGL
19 Apr	Sand Valley Spring Series Championship	Poland	50,000	(Sweden) Adam Wallin	NGL
8 May	Royal Unibrew Championship	Syddanmark	45,000	(Norway) Sebastian Eidsæther Syr	NGL
29 May	Trust Forsikring Championship	Sjælland	50,000	(Denmark) Martin Simonsen	NGL
5 Jun	Samsø Festival Pro-Am	Midtjylland	40,000	(Sweden) David Lundgren	NGL
19 Jun	GolfPromote 25th Anniversary Open	Midtjylland	70,000	(Sweden) Jesper Sandborg	NGL
31 Jul	Max Matthiessen Team Trophy	Sjælland	60,000	(Denmark) August Thor Høst and (Denmark) Christian Jacobsen	NGL
11 Sep	Nicon Industries Championship	Syddanmark	50,000	(Denmark) Daniel Toft (a)	NGL
18 Sep	Søllerød Championship	Sjælland	50,000	(Sweden) Rasmus Holmberg	NGL
16 Oct	Road to Europe Final	Midtjylland	50,000	(Netherlands) Jerry Ji	NGL

== 2025 season ==
=== Schedule ===
The following table lists official events during the 2025 season.

Date	Tournament	Location	Purse (€)	Winner	Main tour
25 Feb	Infinitum Spanish Masters	Spain	50,000	(Denmark) Oliver Hundebøll	NGL
1 Mar	Infinitum Championship	Spain	50,000	(Sweden) Tobias Edén	NGL
5 Mar	Infinitum Spring Series Final	Spain	50,000	(Denmark) Søren Kjeldsen	NGL
15 Apr	Sand Valley Championship	Poland	50,000	(Denmark) Jeppe Kristian Andersen	NGL
19 Apr	ECCO Tour Sand Valley Masters	Poland	50,000	(Denmark) Kasper Nyland	NGL
23 Apr	Sand Valley Spring Series Championship	Poland	50,000	(Sweden) Tobias Edén	NGL
9 May	Bravo Tours Open	Syddanmark	45,000	(Finland) Ilari Saulo	NGL
30 May	Smørum Open	Sjælland	40,000	(Sweden) David Nyfjäll	NGL
6 Jun	Samsø Festival Pro-Am	Midtjylland	35,000	(Denmark) Jamie Tofte Nielsen	NGL
20 Jun	Søllerød Championship	Sjælland	40,000	(Denmark) Benjamin Poke	NGL
1 Aug	Max Matthiessen Team Trophy	Sjælland	60,000	(Norway) Tom Røed Karlsen and (Denmark) Kasper Nyland	NGL
12 Sep	Esbjerg Open	Syddanmark	45,000	(Denmark) August Thor Høst	NGL
18 Sep	Great Northern Challenge	Syddanmark	DKr 500,000	(Sweden) Martin Eriksson	NGL
3 Oct	Trust Forsikring Championship	Sjælland	45,000	(Denmark) Oskar Ambrosius	NGL
17 Oct	Road to Europe Final	Midtjylland	45,000	(Denmark) Jacob Worm Agerschou	NGL

== 2024 season ==
=== Schedule ===
The following table lists official events during the 2024 season.

Date	Tournament	Location	Purse (€)	Winner	Main tour
27 Feb	ECCO Tour Spanish Open	Spain	50,000	(Sweden) Christofer Rahm	NGL
2 Mar	ECCO Tour Catalunya Championship	Spain	50,000	(Denmark) Alexander George Frances	NGL
9 Apr	ECCO Tour Polish Masters	Poland	50,000	(Sweden) Benjamin Hjort	NGL
13 Apr	Sand Valley Championship	Poland	50,000	(Sweden) Albin Tidén	NGL
17 Apr	Sand Valley Spring Series Final	Poland	50,000	(Sweden) Sebastian Petersen	NGL
26 Apr	Bravo Tours Open	Syddanmark	40,000	(Denmark) Jens Kristian Thysted	NGL
31 May	Smørum Open	Sjælland	40,000	(Denmark) Mads Heller (a)	NGL
7 Jun	Samsø Classic Pro-Am	Midtjylland	35,000	(Denmark) Jens Kristian Thysted	NGL
21 Jun	Danish Golf Open	Midtjylland	40,000	(Norway) Philip Linberg Bondestad (a)	NGL
2 Aug	Esbjerg Open	Syddanmark	35,000	(Norway) Jarand Ekeland Arnøy	NGL
13 Sep	H2O x Danish.Golf Championship	Sjælland	35,000	(Denmark) Alexander George Frances	NGL
19 Sep	Great Northern Challenge	Syddanmark	DKr 500,000	(Sweden) Oliver Gillberg	NGL
4 Oct	Trust Forsikring Championship	Sjælland	40,000	(Denmark) Christian Jacobsen	NGL
18 Oct	Road to Europe Final	Sjælland	35,000	(Denmark) Peter Launer Bæk	NGL

== 2023 season ==
=== Schedule ===
The following table lists official events during the 2023 season.

Date	Tournament	Location	Purse (€)	Winner	Main tour
28 Feb	ECCO Tour Spanish Masters	Spain	50,000	(Sweden) Joakim Wikström	NGL
4 Mar	Camiral Golf & Wellness Championship	Spain	50,000	(Norway) Jarand Ekeland Arnøy	NGL
11 Apr	Sand Valley Polish Masters	Poland	50,000	(Norway) Andreas Halvorsen	NGL
15 Apr	Gebwell Championship	Poland	50,000	(Sweden) Charlie Lindh	NGL
19 Apr	Sand Valley Spring Series Final	Poland	50,000	(Norway) Andreas Halvorsen	NGL
28 Apr	Bravo Tours Open	Syddanmark	40,000	(Sweden) Charlie Lindh	NGL
2 Jun	UNICEF Championship	Midtjylland	40,000	(Sweden) Björn Åkesson	NGL
9 Jun	Thomas Bjørn Samsø Classic	Midtjylland	30,000	(Denmark) Sebastian Wiis	NGL
4 Aug	BWT Championship	Hovedstaden	40,000	(Denmark) Morten Toft Hansen	NGL
18 Aug	Esbjerg Open	Syddanmark	35,000	(Denmark) Alexander George Frances	NGL
15 Sep	Trust Forsikring Championship	Sjælland	35,000	(Denmark) Alexander George Frances	NGL
21 Sep	Great Northern Challenge	Syddanmark	DKr 500,000	(Sweden) Adam Andersson	NGL
6 Oct	Aarhus Alliance	Midtjylland	40,000	(Sweden) Charlie Lindh	NGL
20 Oct	Road to Europe Final	Sjælland	35,000	(Sweden) Adam Andersson	NGL

== 2022 season ==
=== Schedule ===
The following table lists official events during the 2022 season.

Date	Tournament	Location	Purse (€)	Winner	Main tour
1 Mar	ECCO Spanish Masters	Spain	50,000	(Denmark) Sebastian Friedrichsen	NGL
5 Mar	PGA Catalunya Resort Championship	Spain	50,000	(Denmark) Jeppe Kristian Andersen	NGL
29 Apr	Bravo Tours Open	Syddanmark	35,000	(Denmark) Frederik Birkelund (a)	NGL
3 Jun	Thisted Forsikring Championship	Nordjylland	35,000	(Denmark) Nicolai Nøhr Madsen	NGL
10 Jun	Thomas Bjørn Samsø Classic	Midtjylland	30,000	(Denmark) Mathias Gladbjerg	NGL
24 Jun	UNICEF Championship	Midtjylland	35,000	(Denmark) Christian Jacobsen	NGL
20 Aug	Esbjerg Open	Syddanmark	35,000	(Denmark) Christian Jacobsen	NGL
16 Sep	Trust Forsikring Championship	Sjælland	35,000	(Denmark) August Thor Høst	NGL
23 Sep	Great Northern Challenge	Syddanmark	DKr 500,000	(Denmark) Frederik Birkelund (a)	NGL
7 Oct	Race to HimmerLand	Nordjylland	40,000	(Denmark) John Axelsen	NGL
21 Oct	Sydbank Road to Europe Final	Sjælland	30,000	(Denmark) Jeppe Kristian Andersen	NGL

=== Order of Merit ===
The Order of Merit was titled as the Race to HimmerLand and was based on tournament results during the season, calculated using a points-based system.

Position	Player	Points
1	(Denmark) Frederik Birkelund	225,727
2	(Denmark) Jeppe Kristian Andersen	221,348
3	(Denmark) Sebastian Friedrichsen	179,377
4	(Denmark) John Axelsen	138,337
5	(Denmark) Hamish Brown	135,693

== 2021 season ==
=== Schedule ===
The following table lists official events during the 2021 season.

Date	Tournament	Location	Purse (€)	Winner	Main tour
16 Apr; ~~6 Mar~~	ECCO Spanish Masters	Spain	50,000	(Denmark) Marcus Helligkilde	NGL
20 Apr; ~~10 Mar~~	PGA Catalunya Resort Championship	Spain	50,000	(Sweden) Mikael Lundberg	NGL
14 May	Made in HimmerLand Qualifier	Syddanmark	35,000	(Denmark) John Axelsen	NGL
11 Jun	Jyske Bank Championship	Midtjylland	35,000	(Denmark) Lasse Jensen	NGL
18 Jun	Samsø Pro-Am Classic	Midtjylland	30,000	(Sweden) Joakim Wikström	NGL
6 Aug	Frederikshavn Championship	Nordjylland	35,000	(Sweden) Tobias Edén	NGL
27 Aug	Thisted Forsikring Championship	Nordjylland	35,000	(Sweden) Elis Svärd	NGL
10 Sep	Trust Forsikring Championship	Sjælland	35,000	(Denmark) Nicolai Tinning	NGL
17 Sep	Great Northern Challenge	Syddanmark	DKr 500,000	(Denmark) Peter Launer Bæk	NGL
8 Oct	Race to HimmerLand	Nordjylland	35,000	(Sweden) Niclas Johansson	NGL
22 Oct	Road to Europe Tour Final	Sjælland	30,000	(Sweden) Christopher Feldborg Nielsen	NGL

=== Order of Merit ===
The Order of Merit was titled as the Race to HimmerLand and was based on tournament results during the season, calculated using a points-based system.

Position	Player	Points
1	(Denmark) Peter Launer Bæk	178,563
2	(Denmark) Lasse Jensen	173,219
3	(Denmark) John Axelsen	135,495
4	(Sweden) Joakim Wikström	120,343
5	(Sweden) Christopher Feldborg Nielsen	106,401

== 2020 season ==
=== Schedule ===
The following table lists official events during the 2020 season.

Date	Tournament	Location	Purse (€)	Winner	Main tour
7 Mar	ECCO Tour Spanish Masters	Spain	DKr 375,000	(Denmark) Jeppe Huldahl	NGL
11 Mar	PGA Catalunya Resort Championship	Spain	DKr 375,000	(Denmark) Jeppe Huldahl	NGL
~~8 May~~	Jyske Bank Made in Denmark Qualifier	Syddanmark	–	Postponed	NGL
~~5 Jun~~	The 12 Twelve - Players Charity	Hovedstaden	–	Postponed	NGL
~~10 Jun~~	Samsø Pro-Am Classic	Midtjylland	–	Postponed	NGL
10 Jun; ~~24 Apr~~	Bravo Tours Open	Syddanmark	25,000	(Denmark) Emily Kristine Pedersen (n/a)	
26 Jun	Jyske Bank Danish PGA Championship	Nordjylland	DKr 300,000	(Denmark) Marcus Helligkilde (1)	
7 Aug	Thisted Forsikring Championship	Nordjylland	35,000	(Sweden) Mikael Lindberg	NGL
21 Aug	Esbjerg Open	Syddanmark	35,000	(Denmark) Niklas Nørgaard	NGL
10 Sep	Destination Fyn Pro-Am	Syddanmark	10,000	(Denmark) John Axelsen (1)	
18 Sep	Ledreborg Palace Golf Masters	Sjælland	30,000	(Sweden) Mikael Lindberg	NGL
4 Oct	Race to HimmerLand	Nordjylland	40,000	(Sweden) Jesper Svensson	NGL

=== Order of Merit ===
The Order of Merit was titled as the Race to HimmerLand and was based on tournament results during the season, calculated using a points-based system.

Position	Player	Points
1	(Denmark) Marcus Helligkilde	123,066
2	(Denmark) Lasse Jensen	62,516
3	(Germany) Benedict Staben	49,337
4	(Denmark) Peter Launer Bæk	49,160
5	(Denmark) Victor Østerby	39,994

== 2019 season ==
=== Schedule ===
The following table lists official events during the 2019 season.

Date	Tournament	Location	Purse (DKr)	Winner	Main tour
14 Feb	Mediter Real Estate Masters	Spain	375,000	(Iceland) Guðmundur Kristjánsson	NGL
19 Feb	PGA Catalunya Resort Championship	Spain	375,000	(Denmark) Morten Ørum Madsen	NGL
27 Apr	Master of the Monster	Germany	€30,000	(Denmark) Nicolai Kristensen	NGL
3 May	Bravo Tours Open	Syddanmark	300,000	(Sweden) Niclas Johansson	NGL
10 May	Jyske Bank Made in Denmark Qualifier	Syddanmark	300,000	(Denmark) Oliver Hundebøll	NGL
7 Jun	Thisted Forsikring Championship	Nordjylland	300,000	(Sweden) Alexander Wennstam	NGL
28 Jun	Tinderbox Charity Challenge	Syddanmark	300,000	(Sweden) Christopher Sahlström	NGL
23 Aug	Esbjerg Open	Syddanmark	300,000	(Norway) Elias Bertheussen	NGL
12 Sep	Great Northern Pro-Am	Syddanmark	100,000	(Sweden) Christopher Sahlström (1)	
20 Sep	Willis Towers Watson Masters	Hovedstaden	300,000	(Denmark) Andreas Lunding	NGL
6 Oct	Race to HimmerLand	Nordjylland	300,000	(Denmark) Niklas Nørgaard	NGL

=== Order of Merit ===
The Order of Merit was titled as the Race to HimmerLand and was based on tournament results during the season, calculated using a points-based system.

Position	Player	Points
1	(Norway) Elias Bertheussen	146,909
2	(Denmark) Niklas Nørgaard	125,412
3	(Sweden) Christopher Sahlström	118,876
4	(Norway) Jarand Ekeland Arnøy	111,800
5	(Denmark) Nicolai Kristensen	111,634

== 2018 season ==
=== Schedule ===
The following table lists official events during the 2018 season.

Date	Tournament	Location	Purse (DKr)	Winner	Main tour
15 Feb	Mediter Real Estate Masters	Spain	375,000	(Denmark) Joachim B. Hansen	NGL
20 Feb	PGA Catalunya Resort Championship	Spain	375,000	(Norway) Aksel Olsen	NGL
27 Apr	Bravo Tours Open	Syddanmark	300,000	(Denmark) Nicolai Højgaard (a)	NGL
4 May	Willis Towers Watson Masters	Hovedstaden	€40,000	(Denmark) Frederik Dreier	NGL
10 May	Master of the Monster	Germany	€30,000	(Sweden) Per Längfors	NGL
1 Jun	Jyske Bank PGA Championship	Midtjylland	300,000	(Sweden) Jacob Glennemo	NGL
14 Jun	12 Twelve Championship	Midtjylland	300,000	(Denmark) Christian Gløët	NGL
3 Aug	Made in Denmark Qualifier	Syddanmark	300,000	(Denmark) Nicolai Tinning	NGL
14 Sep	Tinderbox Charity Challenge	Syddanmark	300,000	(Denmark) Peter Launer Bæk	NGL
21 Sep	Harboe Open	Sjælland	€40,000	(Sweden) Gustav Adell	NGL
7 Oct	Race to HimmerLand	Nordjylland	300,000	(Norway) Aksel Olsen	NGL

=== Order of Merit ===
The Order of Merit was titled as the Race to HimmerLand and was based on tournament results during the season, calculated using a points-based system.

Position	Player	Points
1	(Norway) Aksel Olsen	222,141
2	(Denmark) Martin Simonsen	163,533
3	(Sweden) Jacob Glennemo	134,761
4	(Denmark) Frederik Dreier	129,182
5	(Denmark) Benjamin Poke	104,202

== 2017 season ==
=== Schedule ===
The following table lists official events during the 2017 season.

Date	Tournament	Location	Purse (DKr)	Winner	Main tour
16 Feb	Mediter Real Estate Masters	Spain	375,000	(Germany) Florian Fritsch	NGL
21 Feb	PGA Catalunya Resort Championship	Spain	375,000	(France) Mathieu Fenasse	NGL
5 May	Bravo Tours Open	Syddanmark	300,000	(England) Alex Wrigley	NGL
12 May	Kellers Park Masters	Syddanmark	€40,000	(Sweden) Åke Nilsson	NGL
2 Jun	Jyske Bank PGA Championship	Midtjylland	300,000	(Denmark) Oskar Ambrosius (a)	NGL
16 Jun	Tinderbox Charity Challenge	Syddanmark	411,800	(Sweden) Christopher Feldborg Nielsen	NGL
4 Aug	Made in Denmark Qualifier	Syddanmark	300,000	(Sweden) Åke Nilsson	NGL
9 Sep	Willis Towers Watson Masters	Hovedstaden	300,000	(Sweden) Per Längfors	NGL
22 Sep	12 Twelve Championship	Midtjylland	300,000	(Iceland) Axel Bóasson	NGL
7 Oct	Race to HimmerLand	Nordjylland	375,000	(Sweden) Ludwig Nordeklint	NGL

=== Order of Merit ===
The Order of Merit was titled as the Race to HimmerLand and was based on tournament results during the season, calculated using a points-based system.

Position	Player	Points
1	(Iceland) Axel Bóasson	171,213
2	(Sweden) Åke Nilsson	157,182
3	(Sweden) Ludwig Nordeklint	124,923
4	(Sweden) Christopher Feldborg Nielsen	120,819
5	(Sweden) Per Längfors	90,387

== 2016 season ==
=== Schedule ===
The following table lists official events during the 2016 season.

Date	Tournament	Location	Purse (DKr)	Winner	Main tour
15 Mar	Mediter Real Estate Masters	Spain	375,000	(Denmark) Benjamin Poke	NGL
20 Mar	PGA Catalunya Resort Championship	Spain	375,000	(Denmark) Rasmus Hjelm Nielsen	NGL
29 Apr	Grundfos Masters	Germany	€40,000	(Denmark) Oliver Suhr	NGL
6 May	Kitchen Joy Championship	Syddanmark	€40,000	(Finland) Oliver Lindell	NGL
13 May	Kellers Park Masters	Syddanmark	€50,000	(Finland) Erik Myllymäki	NGL
4 Jun	Jyske Bank PGA Championship	Midtjylland	375,000	(Denmark) Rasmus Hjelm Nielsen	NGL
18 Jun	NorthSide Charity Challenge	Midtjylland	€70,000	(Finland) Oliver Lindell	NGL
6 Aug	Made in Denmark European Tour Qualifier	Syddanmark	300,000	(Denmark) Daniel Løkke	NGL
13 Aug	Isaberg Open	Sweden	SKr 400,000	(Denmark) Mark Haastrup	NGL
10 Sep	Willis Towers Watson Masters	Hovedstaden	300,000	(Denmark) Mathias Gladbjerg	NGL
23 Sep	Thisted Forsikring Championship	Midtjylland	300,000	(Denmark) Kasper Kjær Estrup	NGL
1 Oct	GolfUppsala Open	Sweden	SKr 400,000	(Sweden) Niklas Lindström	NGL
8 Oct	Race to HimmerLand	Nordjylland	375,000	(Sweden) Alexander Wennstam	NGL

=== Order of Merit ===
The Order of Merit was titled as the Race to HimmerLand and was based on prize money won during the season, calculated in Danish krone.

Position	Player	Prize money (DKr)
1	(Finland) Oliver Lindell	253,591
2	(Denmark) Rasmus Hjelm Nielsen	221,359
3	(Sweden) Alexander Wennstam	190,559
4	(Denmark) Mark Haastrup	135,910
5	(Sweden) Oscar Lengdén	135,330

== 2015 season ==
=== Schedule ===
The following table lists official events during the 2015 season.

Date	Tournament	Location	Purse (DKr)	Winner	Main tour
12 Mar	Mediter Real Estate Masters	Spain	375,000	(Sweden) Daniel Jennevret	NGL
17 Mar	PGA Catalunya Resort Championship	Spain	375,000	(Sweden) Åke Nilsson	NGL
1 May	Bravo Tours Open	Syddanmark	300,000	(Denmark) Daniel Løkke	NGL
8 May	NorthSide Charity Challenge	Midtjylland	400,000	(Finland) Tapio Pulkkanen	NGL
23 May	Trummenäs Open	Sweden	SKr 350,000	(Sweden) Simon Forsström	NGL
30 May	Kitchen Joy Championship	Syddanmark	300,000	(Sweden) Per Barth	NGL
5 Jun	Thisted Forsikring Championship	Midtjylland	375,000	(Sweden) Eric Blom	NGL
8 Jun	Jyske Bank Invitational	Midtjylland	€15,000	(Denmark) Benjamin Poke (1)	
26 Jun	ECCO German Masters	Germany	€45,000	(Finland) Tapio Pulkkanen	NGL
31 Jul	Made in Denmark Qualifier	Syddanmark	375,000	(Finland) Tapio Pulkkanen	NGL
8 Aug	Isaberg Open	Sweden	SKr 400,000	(Sweden) Anton Wejshag	NGL
4 Sep	Willis Masters	Hovedstaden	300,000	(Sweden) Daniel Jennevret	NGL
19 Sep	Danæg PGA Championship	Sjælland	337,500	(Denmark) Nicolai Tinning	NGL
27 Sep	GolfUppsala Open	Sweden	SKr 400,000	(Sweden) Richard Pettersson	NGL
3 Oct	Race to HimmerLand	Nordjylland	375,000	(Sweden) Christofer Blomstrand	NGL

=== Order of Merit ===
The Order of Merit was titled as the Race to HimmerLand and was based on prize money won during the season, calculated in Danish krone.

Position	Player	Prize money (DKr)
1	(Finland) Tapio Pulkkanen	282,813
2	(Sweden) Eric Blom	177,220
3	(Denmark) Daniel Løkke	157,561
4	(Norway) Eirik Tage Johansen	154,147
5	(Sweden) Daniel Jennevret	142,684

== 2014 season ==
=== Schedule ===
The following table lists official events during the 2014 season.

Date	Tournament	Location	Purse (DKr)	Winner	Main tour
23 Mar	La Manga Club Championship	Spain	€50,000	(Finland) Kalle Samooja	NGL
28 Mar	Mediter Real Estate Masters	Spain	€60,000	(Sweden) Steven Jeppesen	NGL
2 May	DAT Masters	Syddanmark	300,000	(Sweden) Jacob Glennemo	NGL
10 May	Bravo Tours Open	Syddanmark	300,000	(Sweden) Christopher Feldborg Nielsen	NGL
25 May	Landskrona Masters PGA Championship	Sweden	SKr 400,000	(Sweden) Fredrik Gustavsson	NGL
30 May	Jyske Bank PGA Championship	Midtjylland	375,000	(Sweden) Marcus Larsson	NGL
6 Jun	Actona Championship	Midtjylland	300,000	(Denmark) Nicolai Kristensen (a)	NGL
28 Jun	Ejner Hessel Championship	Sjælland	300,000	(Denmark) Nicolai Kristensen (a)	NGL
26 Jul	Finnish Open	Finland	€60,000	(Norway) Elias Bertheussen	NGL
3 Aug	Made in Denmark European Tour Qualifier	Syddanmark	€50,000	(Sweden) Jesper Gaardsdal	NGL
9 Aug	Isaberg Open	Sweden	SKr 350,000	(Sweden) Daniel Jennevret	NGL
26 Aug	EY Barsebäck Invitational	Sweden	€15,000	(Denmark) Martin Ovesen (1)	
5 Sep	Willis Masters	Hovedstaden	300,000	(Sweden) Oscar Zetterwall	NGL
19 Sep	Kitchen Joy Championship	Syddanmark	300,000	(Sweden) Jesper Billing	NGL
27 Sep	Lindahl Masters	Sweden	SKr 400,000	(Sweden) Sebastian Hansson	NGL
4 Oct	Race to HimmerLand	Nordjylland	450,000	(Sweden) Jacob Glennemo	NGL

=== Order of Merit ===
The Order of Merit was titled as the Race to HimmerLand and was based on prize money won during the season, calculated in Danish krone.

Position	Player	Prize money (DKr)
1	(Sweden) Jacob Glennemo	280,040
2	(Sweden) Steven Jeppesen	208,012
3	(Sweden) Jesper Billing	206,335
4	(Sweden) Oscar Zetterwall	171,307
5	(Norway) Elias Bertheussen	156,807

== 2013 season ==
=== Schedule ===
The following table lists official events during the 2013 season.

Date	Tournament	Location	Purse (DKr)	Winner	Main tour
17 Mar	Mediter Real Estate Masters	Spain	€40,000	(Sweden) Richard Pettersson	NGL
22 Mar	ECCO Spanish Open	Spain	€40,000	(Denmark) Lucas Bjerregaard	NGL
4 May	Freja Championship	Nordjylland	300,000	(Sweden) Jesper Kennegård	NGL
24 May	Landskrona Masters	Sweden	SKr 400,000	(Sweden) Tony Edlund	NGL
11 May	DAT Masters	Syddanmark	300,000	(Denmark) Morten Ørum Madsen	NGL
1 Jun	Bravo Tours Open	Syddanmark	300,000	(Denmark) Jeff Winther	NGL
7 Jun	Samsø Pro-Am Classic	Midtjylland	300,000	(Sweden) Richard Pettersson	NGL
28 Jun	Mercedes-Benz Matchplay	Midtjylland	300,000	(Sweden) Joakim Rask	NGL
27 Jul	Finnish Open	Finland	€60,000	(Denmark) Kasper Kjær Estrup	NGL
2 Aug	Mørk Masters	Norway	€50,000	(Estonia) Mark Suursalu	NGL
17 Aug	ECCO Tournament of Champions	Nordjylland	300,000	(Denmark) Jeff Winther	NGL
27 Aug	Golf Experten Barsebäck Invitational	Sweden	€12,000	(Denmark) Kristian Grud (1)	
6 Sep	Willis Masters	Hovedstaden	300,000	(Sweden) Sebastian Söderberg	NGL
20 Sep	Actona PGA Championship	Midtjylland	375,000	(Sweden) Sebastian Söderberg	NGL
5 Oct	Backtee Race to HimmerLand	Nordjylland	450,000	(Denmark) Lasse Jensen	NGL

=== Order of Merit ===
The Order of Merit was titled as the Backtee Race to HimmerLand and was based on prize money won during the season, calculated in Danish krone.

Position	Player	Prize money (DKr)
1	(Denmark) Jeff Winther	197,385
2	(Sweden) Richard Pettersson	169,969
3	(Sweden) Niclas Johansson	148,646
4	(Sweden) Joakim Rask	132,772
5	(Denmark) Lasse Jensen	125,400

== 2012 season ==
=== Schedule ===
The following table lists official events during the 2012 season.

Date	Tournament	Location	Purse (DKr)	Winner	OWGR points	Main tour	Other tours (Note: CHA − Challenge Tour.)
18 Mar	ECCO Spanish Open	Spain	€45,000	(Norway) Christian Aronsen	n/a	NGL	
23 Mar	Mediter Real Estate Masters	Spain	€45,000	(Sweden) Jens Fahrbring	n/a	NGL	
4 May	Sydbank Masters	Syddanmark	300,000	(Denmark) Jeff Winther	n/a	NGL	
11 May	Club La Santa Championship	Hovedstaden	300,000	(Denmark) John Davies	n/a	NGL	
8 Jun	Samsø Classic	Midtjylland	250,000	(Denmark) Steen Tinning	n/a	NGL	
17 Jun	Danjord Masters	Midtjylland	300,000	(Norway) Peter Kaensche	n/a	NGL	
29 Jun	Bravo Tours Open	Midtjylland	300,000	(Sweden) David Palm	n/a	NGL	
5 Aug	Mørk Masters	Norway	300,000	(Norway) Kenneth Svanum	n/a	NGL	
18 Aug	ECCO Tour Championship	Midtjylland	1,200,000	(Italy) Alessandro Tadini (n/a)	12		CHA
26 Aug	Landskrona Masters	Sweden	SKr 400,000	(Sweden) Jacob Glennemo	n/a	NGL	
28 Aug	Barsebäck Invitational	Sweden	€12,000	(Denmark) Christoffer Lange (1)	n/a		
7 Sep	Willis Masters	Hovedstaden	300,000	(Sweden) Jonathan Ågren	n/a	NGL	
21 Sep	Freja PGA Championship	Nordjylland	300,000	(Sweden) Peter Malmgren	n/a	NGL	
6 Oct	Backtee Race To HimmerLand	Nordjylland	520,000	(Sweden) Jens Dantorp	n/a	NGL	

=== Order of Merit ===
The Order of Merit was titled as the Backtee Race to HimmerLand and was based on prize money won during the season, calculated in Danish krone.

Position	Player	Prize money (DKr)
1	(Denmark) Lucas Bjerregaard	204,438
2	(Italy) Alessandro Tadini	192,000
3	(Sweden) Jens Fahrbring	177,185
4	(Sweden) Jens Dantorp	162,937
5	(Sweden) Jacob Glennemo	145,186

== 2011 season ==
=== Schedule ===
The following table lists official events during the 2011 season.

Date	Tournament	Location	Purse (DKr)	Winner	OWGR points	Main tour	Other tours
3 Mar	Backtee Spanish Open	Spain	€30,000	(Sweden) Anders Sjöstrand	n/a	NGL	
7 Mar	ECCO Spanish Open	Spain	€30,000	(Sweden) Joakim Lagergren	n/a	NGL	
11 Mar	Mediter Real Estate Masters	Spain	€30,000	(Sweden) Krister Eriksson	n/a	NGL	
6 May	JELD-WEN Masters	Nordjylland	250,000	(Sweden) David Palm	n/a	NGL	
13 May	Samsø Classic	Midtjylland	300,000	(Denmark) Knud Storgaard	n/a	NGL	
20 May	Danfoss Masters	Syddanmark	300,000	(Sweden) Joakim Bäckström	n/a	NGL	
18 Jun	Willis Masters	Hovedstaden	300,000	(Denmark) Niklas Nørgaard (a)	n/a	NGL	
2 Jul	Mørk Masters	Norway	300,000	(Sweden) Kristoffer Broberg	n/a	NGL	
5 Aug	Actona PGA Championship	Midtjylland	300,000	(Denmark) Morten Ørum Madsen	n/a	NGL	
20 Aug	ECCO Tour Championship	Midtjylland	1,200,000	(England) Daniel Denison (n/a)	12		CHA
23 Aug	Barsebäck Invitational	Sweden	100,000	(Sweden) Johan Wahlqvist (1)	n/a		
28 Aug	Landskrona Masters	Sweden	SKr 450,000	(Sweden) Andreas Högberg	n/a	NGL	
9 Sep	Bravo Tours Open	Midtjylland	300,000	(Sweden) Jens Dantorp	n/a	NGL	
24 Sep	Golf Experten Open	Nordjylland	300,000	(Sweden) Jens Dantorp	n/a	NGL	
8 Oct	Backtee Race to HimmerLand	Nordjylland	520,000	(Sweden) Jens Dantorp	n/a	NGL	

=== Order of Merit ===
The Order of Merit was titled as the Backtee Race to HimmerLand and was based on prize money won during the season, calculated in Danish krone.

Position	Player	Prize money (DKr)
1	(Sweden) Jens Dantorp	290,136
2	(England) Daniel Denison	192,000
3	(Denmark) Morten Ørum Madsen	178,472
4	(Denmark) Joachim B. Hansen	172,407
5	(Sweden) Andreas Högberg	133,819

== 2010 season ==
=== Schedule ===
The following table lists official events during the 2010 season.

Date	Tournament	Location	Purse (DKr)	Winner	OWGR points	Main tour	Other tours
9 Mar	La Manga Masters I	Spain	€30,000	(Denmark) Thomas Nørret	n/a	NGL	
13 Mar	La Manga Masters II	Spain	€30,000	(Norway) Jan-Are Larsen	n/a	NGL	
17 Mar	Titleist Trophy	Spain	€50,000	(Sweden) Pontus Ericsson	n/a	NGL	
13 May	JELD-WEN Masters	Nordjylland	275,000	(Denmark) Thomas Nørret	n/a	NGL	
22 May	Willis Masters	Sjælland	300,000	(Norway) Marius Thorp	n/a	NGL	
12 Jun	Danfoss Masters	Syddanmark	275,000	(Denmark) Rasmus Hjelm Nielsen	n/a	NGL	
18 Jun	Golf Experten Open	Nordjylland	250,000	(Denmark) Joachim B. Hansen (a)	n/a	NGL	
30 Jun	Unibake Masters	Midtjylland	300,000	(Sweden) Gustav Adell	n/a	NGL	
31 Jul	Green Eagle Classic	Germany	€30,000	(Sweden) Gustav Adell	n/a	NGL	
22 Aug	ECCO Tour Championship	Germany	1,350,000	(Denmark) Andreas Hartø (a) (n/a)	12		CHA
29 Aug	Landskrona Masters	Sweden	SKr 450,000	(Sweden) Joakim Lagergren	n/a	NGL	
8 Sep	Samsø Masters	Midtjylland	300,000	(Sweden) David Palm	n/a	NGL	
25 Sep	Krone Golf Tours Open	Hovedstaden	250,000	(Sweden) Wilhelm Schauman	n/a	NGL	
16 Oct	Backtee Race to HimmerLand	Nordjylland	750,000	(Denmark) Knud Storgaard	n/a	NGL	

=== Order of Merit ===
The Order of Merit was titled as the Backtee Race to HimmerLand and was based on prize money won during the season, calculated in Danish krone.

Position	Player	Prize money (DKr)
1	(Denmark) Thomas Nørret	182,119
2	(Denmark) Knud Storgaard	179,363
3	(Sweden) Gustav Adell	173,415
4	(Denmark) Rasmus Hjelm Nielsen	167,441
5	(Sweden) Marcus Palm	143,223

== 2009 season ==
=== Schedule ===
The following table lists official events during the 2009 season.

Date	Tournament	Location	Purse (DKr)	Winner	Main tour
10 May	Danfoss Masters	Syddanmark	300,000	(Sweden) Mattias Eliasson	NGL
23 May	Willis Masters	Sjælland	300,000	(Norway) Peter Kaensche	NGL
21 Jun	Unibake Masters	Midtjylland	300,000	(Sweden) Mattias Eliasson	NGL
29 Jul	Green Eagle Classic	Germany	€30,000	(Germany) Constantin Schwierz	NGL
15 Aug	JELD-WEN Masters	Nordjylland	300,000	(Denmark) Thorbjørn Olesen	NGL
30 Aug	Landskrona Masters	Sweden	SKr 400,000	(Denmark) Lasse Jensen	NGL
6 Sep	Ledreborg Danish PGA Championship	Hovedstaden	300,000	(Denmark) Lasse Jensen	NGL
4 Oct	ECCO Tour Championship	Midtjylland	€180,000	(Portugal) José-Filipe Lima	NGL
21 Oct	ECCO Tour Qualification	Nordjylland	100,000	(Sweden) Anders Sjöstrand	NGL
25 Oct	Backtee Race to HimmerLand	Nordjylland	€100,000	(Sweden) Fredrik Henge	NGL

=== Order of Merit ===
The Order of Merit was titled as the Backtee Race to HimmerLand and was based on prize money won during the season, calculated in Danish krone.

Position	Player	Prize money (DKr)
1	(Portugal) José-Filipe Lima	216,000
2	(Sweden) Mattias Eliasson	207,990
3	(Denmark) Lasse Jensen	198,692
4	(Sweden) Fredrik Henge	177,206
5	(Italy) Edoardo Molinari	148,500

== 2008 season ==
=== Schedule ===
The following table lists official events during the 2008 season.

Date	Tournament	Location	Purse (DKr)	Winner	Main tour
29 Apr	ECCO Tour Qualification	Syddanmark	150,000	(Denmark) Steven Chad	NGL
3 May	Brundtland Open	Syddanmark	225,000	(Denmark) Peter Møller Hansen	NGL
25 May	Løgstør Parkhotel Masters	Nordjylland	€40,000	(Denmark) Nicolai Bech	NGL
1 Jun	Danfoss Masters	Syddanmark	300,000	(Finland) Jaakko Mäkitalo	NGL
22 Jun	Unibake Masters	Midtjylland	€40,000	(Norway) Thomas Nielsen	NGL
17 Aug	Estatum Masters	Sjælland	€40,000	(Norway) Eirik Tage Johansen	NGL
31 Aug	ECCO Tour Championship	Hovedstaden	€180,000	(Finland) Antti Ahokas	NGL
21 Sep	Visma Masters	Hovedstaden	€50,000	(Sweden) Magnus Persson Atlevi	NGL
22 Oct	ECCO Tour Qualification	Nordjylland	225,000	(Denmark) Thorbjørn Olesen	NGL
26 Oct	Nickent Golf Invitational Pro-Am	Nordjylland	€40,000	(Denmark) Thomas Nørret	NGL

=== Order of Merit ===
The Order of Merit was based on prize money won during the season, calculated in Danish krone.

Position	Player	Prize money (DKr)
1	(Norway) Eirik Tage Johansen	191,432
2	(Denmark) Thomas Nørret	107,498
3	(Denmark) Michael Jürgensen	99,264
4	(Denmark) Thorbjørn Olesen	90,003
5	(Sweden) Magnus Persson Atlevi	79,275

== 2007 season ==
=== Schedule ===
The following table lists official events during the 2007 season.

Date	Tournament	Location	Purse (DKr)	Winner	Main tour
23 Feb	Backtee Open I	Spain	€10,000	(Denmark) Brian Akstrup	NGL
2 Mar	Backtee Open II	Spain	€15,000	(Finland) Janne Mommo	NGL
9 Mar	Backtee Championship	Spain	€10,000	(Sweden) Robert Eriksson	NGL
20 Apr	Danfoss/Nykredit Open	Syddanmark	€15,000	(Sweden) Robert Johansén	NGL
26 Apr	Rømø Golf & Wellness Open	Syddanmark	€15,000	(Sweden) Andreas Högberg	NGL
3 May	Brundtland Open	Hovedstaden	225,000	(Denmark) Anders Schmidt Hansen	NGL
10 May	Smørum Golfcenter Open	Sjælland	€15,000	(Finland) Erik Stenman	NGL
17 May	Finansbanken Open	Sjælland	€15,000	(Denmark) Peter Ankersø	NGL
2 Jun	Dangaard Telecom Masters	Syddanmark	300,000	(Denmark) Jeppe Huldahl	NGL
23 Jun	Bornholm Masters	Hovedstaden	€25,000	(Norway) Christian Aronsen	NGL
27 Jun	Multidata Masters	Hovedstaden	300,000	(Denmark) Andreas Kali	NGL
28 Jun	Ishøj Golf Center Open	Hovedstaden	225,000	(Sweden) Marcus Palm	NGL
22 Jul	Centrebet Open	Hovedstaden	€15,000	(Denmark) Joachim H. Larsen	NGL
29 Jul	Hansabanka Baltic Open	Latvia	€55,000	(Sweden) Andreas Högberg	NGL
5 Aug	Willis Masters	Sjælland	225,000	(Sweden) Matthew Bliss	NGL
8 Aug	Handelsbanken Finans Open	Sjælland	240,000	(Denmark) Kristian Nielsen	NGL
19 Aug	Weber Masters	Nordjylland	300,000	(Denmark) Knud Storgaard	NGL
~~26 Aug~~	Thomas Bjørn Open	Midtjylland	–	Cancelled	NGL
2 Sep	ECCO Tour Championship	Syddanmark	€130,000	(England) Iain Pyman	NGL
~~16 Sep~~	HimmerLand National Pro-Am	Nordjylland	–	Cancelled	NGL
30 Sep	TourGolf Open	Sweden	SKr 350,000	(Sweden) Jonas Pettersson	NGL
7 Oct	SUN-AIR Open	Syddanmark	€15,000	(Denmark) Peter Ankersø	NGL
14 Oct	Unibake Masters	Midtjylland	300,000	(Sweden) Rikard Karlberg	NGL

=== Order of Merit ===
The Order of Merit was based on tournament results during the season, calculated using a points-based system.

Position	Player	Points
1	(Sweden) Andreas Högberg	13,390
2	(Sweden) Rikard Karlberg	9,681
3	(Denmark) Peter Ankersø	8,332
4	(Sweden) Matthew Bliss	8,285
5	(Denmark) Brian Akstrup	7,311

== 2006 season ==
=== Schedule ===
The following table lists official events during the 2006 season.

Date	Tournament	Location	Purse (DKr)	Winner	Main tour
24 Feb	Winter Series #1	Portugal	€15,000	(Finland) Jaakko Mäkitalo	NGL
3 Mar	Winter Series #2	Portugal	€15,000	(Sweden) Petter Bocian	NGL
10 Mar	Winter Series #3	Portugal	€15,000	(Sweden) Robert Johansén	NGL
27 Apr	IBM Open	Sjælland	€15,000	(Denmark) John Davies	NGL
4 May	Brundtland Open	Hovedstaden	225,000	(Sweden) Peter Malmgren	NGL
11 May	Eurocard Open	Sjælland	€15,000	(Denmark) Christoffer Lange	NGL
1 Jun	Dangaard Telekom - Fleggard Leasing Open	Syddanmark	225,000	(Finland) Janne Martikainen	NGL
22 Jun	Herning Open	Midtjylland	€15,000	(Sweden) Fredrik Ohlsson	NGL
27 Jun	DG Event Open	Nordjylland	€25,000	(Denmark) Steen Ottosen	NGL
2 Jul	Danfoss Open	Syddanmark	€15,000	(Denmark) Peter Ankersø	NGL
6 Jul	Ladbrokes Golf Championship	Nordjylland	225,000	(Denmark) Peter Jespersen	NGL
25 Jul	Centrebet Open	Hovedstaden	€15,000	(Denmark) Morten Hedegaard	NGL
9 Aug	Aller Masters	Sjælland	225,000	(Sweden) Pontus Ericsson	NGL
13 Aug	Willis Open	Sjælland	€15,000	(Finland) Janne Martikainen	NGL
19 Aug	Bornholm Masters	Hovedstaden	€25,000	(Sweden) Lars Edvinson	NGL
27 Aug	ECCO Tour Championship	Syddanmark	€130,000	(England) James Heath	NGL
24 Sep	Ingram Micro Open	Sjælland	€15,000	(Denmark) Christoffer Lange	NGL
1 Oct	TourGolf Masters	Sweden	SKr 600,000	(Sweden) Pelle Edberg	NGL
6 Oct	Smørum Open	Sjælland	€15,000	(Denmark) Morten Hedegaard	NGL
14 Oct	Scanplan Tour Final	Nordjylland	€15,000	(Sweden) Per G. Nyman	NGL

=== Order of Merit ===
The Order of Merit was based on tournament results during the season, calculated using a points-based system.

Position	Player	Points
1	(Denmark) Christoffer Lange	1,484
2	(Sweden) Fredrik Ohlsson	1,277
3	(Finland) Janne Mommo	1,123
4	(Denmark) Morten Hedegaard	1,113
5	(Denmark) Steen Ottosen	1,073

== 2005 season ==
=== Schedule ===
The following table lists official events during the 2005 season.

Date	Tournament	Location	Purse (€)	Winner	Main tour
28 Apr	Berlingske Open	Hovedstaden	15,000	(Finland) Ville Karhu	NGL
6 May	Eurocard Open	Sjælland	15,000	(Norway) Morten Hagen	NGL
15 May	Wavin Open	Syddanmark	25,000	(Denmark) Knud Storgaard	NGL
28 May	Danfoss Open	Syddanmark	15,000	(Denmark) Allan Høgh Madsen	NGL
25 Jun	Sydbank Open	Midtjylland	25,000	(Denmark) Steen Ottosen	NGL
2 Jul	IBM/teetime.dk Open	Sjælland	15,000	(Sweden) Lars Edvinson	NGL
7 Jul	Centrebet Open	Hovedstaden	15,000	(Denmark) Mark Haastrup (a)	NGL
28 Jul	Logida Open	Hovedstaden	12,000	(Sweden) Åke Nilsson	NGL
5 Aug	Willis Open	Sjælland	15,000	(Sweden) Per G. Nyman	NGL
14 Aug	Marienlyst Open	Hovedstaden	25,000	(Denmark) Søren Juul	NGL
5 Sep	Base1 Open	Sjælland	15,000	(Sweden) Raimo Sjöberg	NGL
9 Sep	Bornholm Open	Hovedstaden	12,000	(Sweden) Raimo Sjöberg	NGL
18 Sep	Danica Pension Open	Syddanmark	12,000	(Sweden) Gustav Nyblom	NGL
2 Oct	Danparcs Open	Sjælland	12,000	(Finland) Panu Kylliäinen	NGL
9 Oct	Öresund Masters	Sweden	SKr 600,000	(Sweden) Christian Nilsson	NGL

=== Order of Merit ===
The Order of Merit was based on tournament results during the season, calculated using a points-based system.

Position	Player	Points
1	(Sweden) Raimo Sjöberg	1,153
2	(Sweden) Markus Westerberg	1,104
3	(Sweden) Lars Edvinson	1,008
4	(Finland) Mikko Korhonen	870
5	(Finland) Panu Kylliäinen	859

== 2004 season ==
=== Schedule ===
The following table lists official events during the 2004 season.

Date	Tournament	Location	Purse (€)	Winner	Main tour
24 Apr	Wilson Open	Syddanmark	25,000	(Denmark) Søren Juul	NGL
29 Apr	Royal Oak Open	Syddanmark	15,000	(Sweden) Peter Viktor	NGL
23 May	Danica Pension Masters	Syddanmark	25,000	(Denmark) Michael Jürgensen	NGL
30 May	Rönnebäck Open	Sweden	SKr 250,000	(Sweden) Peter Viktor	NGL
24 Jun	KIA Open	Hovedstaden	15,000	(Sweden) Fredrik Söderström	NGL
3 Jul	Brande Open	Nordjylland	25,000	(Sweden) Peter Viktor	NGL
3 Aug	Hjarbæk Open	Midtjylland	15,000	(Sweden) Joakim Bäckström	NGL
11 Aug	Trehöje Open	Midtjylland	25,000	(Sweden) Dale Harris	NGL
19 Aug	ECCO Open - Danish PGA Championship	Hovedstaden	40,000	(Sweden) Niclas Gyllengahm (a)	NGL
24 Sep	Nordic League Final	Nordjylland	27,000	(Norway) Øyvind Rojahn	NGL

=== Order of Merit ===
The Order of Merit was based on tournament results during the season, calculated using a points-based system.

Position	Player	Points
1	(Sweden) Peter Viktor	1,448
2	(Sweden) Dale Harris	1,200
3	(Norway) Thomas Nielsen	1,126
4	(Sweden) Niclas Gyllengahm (a)	840
5	(Finland) Thomas Sundström	837

== 2003 season ==
=== Schedule ===
The following table lists official events during the 2003 season.

Date	Tournament	Location	Purse (€)	Winner	Main tour
26 Apr	Viasat Sport Open	Syddanmark	15,000	(Sweden) Fredrik Söderström	NGL
30 Apr	Wilson Open	Syddanmark	15,000	(Denmark) Allan Høgh Madsen	NGL
8 Jun	Rönnebäck Open	Sweden	15,000	(Sweden) Pelle Edberg	NGL
29 Jun	Telia Open	Sweden	47,000	(Denmark) Christian Bindslev	NGL
6 Jul	Clubhouse Open	Midtjylland	15,000	(Denmark) Anders Bøgebjerg	NGL
11 Jul	Hjarbæk Open	Midtjylland	15,000	(Denmark) Jesper Bentsen	NGL
27 Jul	Nordic Open Qualifying	Syddanmark	25,000	(Sweden) Jakob Berlin	NGL
24 Aug	Griffin Open	Nordjylland	34,000	(Sweden) Jonas Torines	NGL
11 Sep	Falster Open	Sjælland	15,000	(Sweden) Andreas Ljunggren	NGL
28 Sep	Marlboro Classic Masters	Nordjylland	15,000	(Sweden) Joakim Bäckström	NGL

=== Order of Merit ===
The Order of Merit was based on tournament results during the season, calculated using a points-based system.

Position	Player	Points
1	(Norway) Øyvind Rojahn	1,295
2	(Sweden) Jonas Torines (a)	1,022
3	(Sweden) Andreas Ljunggren	788
4	(Sweden) Pelle Edberg	725
5	(Sweden) Johan Bjerhag	595
