= ECCO Tour Championship =

Tournament information
- Location: Horsens, Denmark
- Established: 2006
- Course: Stensballegaard Golf
- Par: 72
- Length: 7,578 yards (6,929 m)
- Tours: Challenge Tour; Nordic Golf League; Danish Golf Tour
- Format: Stroke play
- Prize fund: kr. 1,200,000
- Month played: August
- Final year: 2012

Tournament record score
- Aggregate: 260 Iain Pyman (2007)
- To par: −20 as above

Final champion
- (Italy) Alessandro Tadini
- Location in Denmark

The ECCO Tour Championship was the most prestigious golf tournament on the Denmark-based Danish Golf Tour (titled as the ECCO Tour for sponsorship reasons), being jointly sanctioned by Europe's second-tier Challenge Tour. It ran annually from 2006 to 2012. In 2010, it was held outside Denmark for the first time, when it was hosted at Green Eagle Golf Club in Winsen near Hamburg, Germany.

== Winners ==
Year	Tours (Note: CHA − Challenge Tour; DNK − Danish Golf Tour; NGL − Nordic Golf League.)	Winner	Score	To par	Margin of victory	Runner(s)-up	Venue
2012	CHA, DNK	(Italy) Alessandro Tadini	276	−12	Playoff	(England) James Busby	Stensballegaard
2011	CHA, DNK	(England) Daniel Denison	208 (Note: Shortened to 54 holes due to weather.)	−8	1 stroke	(France) Charles-Édouard Russo	Lübker
2010	CHA, DNK	(Denmark) Andreas Hartø (a)	284	−8	1 stroke	(Sweden) Oscar Florén	Green Eagle
2009	CHA, NGL	(Portugal) José-Filipe Lima	211	−5	1 stroke	(Italy) Edoardo Molinari	Holstebro
2008	CHA, NGL	(Finland) Antti Ahokas	271	−17	1 stroke	(Netherlands) Wil Besseling (Norway) Eirik Tage Johansen (Finland) Roope Kakko (Netherlands) Taco Remkes	Kokkedal
2007	CHA, NGL	(England) Iain Pyman	260	−20	3 strokes	(Sweden) Magnus A. Carlsson (England) John E. Morgan	Odense
2006	CHA, NGL	(England) James Heath	261	−19	3 strokes	(Denmark) Thomas Nørret	Odense
