= Danish PGA Championship =

Jyske Bank Danish PGA Championship
Tournament information
- Location: Farsø, Denmark
- Established: 1993
- Courses: HimmerLand Golf & Spa Resort
- Par: 73
- Length: 6,855 yards (6,268 m)
- Tours: Challenge Tour; Nordic Golf League; Danish Golf Tour
- Format: Stroke play
- Prize fund: kr. 300,000
- Month played: June
- Final year: 2020

Tournament record score
- Aggregate: 201 Sebastian Söderberg (2013)
- To par: −17 Marcus Helligkilde (2020)

Final champion
- (Denmark) Marcus Helligkilde
- Location in Denmark

The Danish PGA Championship was a golf tournament in the Nordic Golf League held in Denmark. From 1993 to 1997 it was an event on the Challenge Tour.

== Winners ==
Year	Tour (Note: CHA − Challenge Tour; DNK − Danish Golf Tour; NGL − Nordic Golf League.)	Winner	Score	To par	Margin of victory	Runner(s)-up	Venue
Jyske Bank Danish PGA Championship
2020	DNK	(Denmark) Marcus Helligkilde	202	−17	2 strokes	(Denmark) Niklas Nørgaard	HimmerLand
2019: No tournament
Jyske Bank PGA Championship
2018	NGL	(Sweden) Jacob Glennemo	204	−12	1 stroke	(Norway) Anders Strand Ellingsberg	Silkeborg
2017	NGL	(Denmark) Oskar Ambrosius (a)	203	−13	4 strokes	(Denmark) Martin Simonsen	Silkeborg
2016	NGL	(Denmark) Rasmus Hjelm Nielsen	204	−12	1 stroke	(Denmark) Philip Ulveman Juel-Berg	Silkeborg
Danæg PGA Championship
2015	NGL	(Denmark) Nicolai Tinning	207	−9	Playoff	(Sweden) Anton Karlsson	Skjoldenæsholm
Jyske Bank PGA Championship
2014	NGL	(Sweden) Marcus Larsson	212	−2	3 strokes	(Sweden) Christopher Feldborg Nielsen (Denmark) Mads Søgaard	Silkeborg
Actona PGA Championship
2013	NGL	(Sweden) Sebastian Söderberg	201	−9	Playoff	(Denmark) Daniel Løkke	Holstebro
Freja PGA Championship
2012	NGL	(Sweden) Peter Malmgren	205	−11	Playoff	(Sweden) Jens Dantorp (Denmark) Rasmus Hjelm Nielsen	HimmerLand
Actona PGA Championship
2011	NGL	(Denmark) Morten Ørum Madsen	210	−6	2 strokes	(Denmark) Joachim B. Hansen	Lübker
2010: No tournament
Ledreborg Danish PGA Championship
2009	NGL	(Denmark) Lasse Jensen	202	−11	3 strokes	(Sweden) Niklas Bruzelius	Copenhagen
2005–2008: No tournament
ECCO Open - Danish PGA Championship
2004	NGL	(Sweden) Niclas Gyllengahm (a)	212	−4	5 strokes	(Denmark) Peter Jespersen	Simons
1998–2003: No tournament
Toyota Danish PGA Championship
1997	CHA	(Sweden) Fredrik Henge	202	−14	2 strokes	(Sweden) Martin Erlandsson (Denmark) Søren Kjeldsen	Odense Eventyr
1996	CHA	(Sweden) Adam Mednick	202	−11	1 stroke	(Sweden) Patrik Gottfridson	Helsingor
1995	CHA	(France) François Lamare	209	−7	2 strokes	(Denmark) Jesper Happel (Sweden) Magnus Persson	Sollerod
1994	CHA	(Sweden) Anders Overbring	204	−12	2 strokes	(Denmark) Ben Tinning	Gilleleje
1993	CHA	(Sweden) Fredrik Andersson	207	−6	2 strokes	(Sweden) Rikard Strångert	Vallensbaek
