= 2008 Swedish Golf Tour =

Golf tour season

2008 Swedish Golf Tour season
- Duration: 8 May 2008 – 4 October 2008
- Number of official events: 15
- Order of Merit: (Sweden) Petter Bocian

The 2008 Swedish Golf Tour, titled as the 2008 SAS Masters Tour for sponsorship reasons, was the 25th season of the Swedish Golf Tour, the main professional golf tour in Sweden since it was formed in 1984, with most tournaments being incorporated into the Nordic Golf League since 1999.

== Scandinavian Airlines title sponsorship ==
In March, it was announced that the tour had signed a title sponsorship agreement with Scandinavian Airlines, being renamed as the SAS Masters Tour.

== Schedule ==
The following table lists official events during the 2008 season.

Date	Tournament	Location	Purse (SKr)	Winner (Note: The number in brackets after each winner's name is the number of Swedish Golf Tour events they had won up to and including that tournament. As most Swedish Golf Tour events are incorporated into the Nordic Golf League or Challenge Tour schedules, details of these wins are displayed there instead.)	Main tour (Note: CHA − Challenge Tour; NGL − Nordic Golf League.)
10 May	Telenor Masters	Skåne	300,000	(Sweden) Petter Bocian	NGL
24 May	PayEx Masters	Norway	300,000	(Sweden) Kalle Edberg	NGL
31 May	Söderby Masters	Uppland	300,000	(Sweden) Pehr Magnebrant	NGL
7 Jun	Kristianstad Masters	Skåne	300,000	(Sweden) Fredrik Hammarberg	NGL
15 Jun	Husqvarna Open	Småland	500,000	(Sweden) Johan Bjerhag	NGL
19 Jun	Österlen Masters	Skåne	350,000	(Sweden) Petter Bocian	NGL
27 Jul	Hansabanka Baltic Open	Latvia	€50,000	(Sweden) Per Barth	NGL
9 Aug	Pensum Invitational	Ångermanland	400,000	(Denmark) Oliver Suhr	NGL
22 Aug	SM Match	Närke	300,000	(Sweden) Åke Nilsson	NGL
31 Aug	Gant Open	Finland	300,000	(Sweden) Jens Dantorp	NGL
7 Sep	Dubliner Challenge	Västergötland	€140,000	(Denmark) Mark Haastrup	CHA
14 Sep	Landskrona Masters	Skåne	300,000	(Sweden) Anders Sjöstrand	NGL
21 Sep	Visma Masters	Denmark	€50,000	(Sweden) Magnus Persson Atlevi	NGL
27 Sep	PGA Landmann Open	Halland	400,000	(Sweden) Jonas Enander-Hedin	NGL
4 Oct	Volkswagen Kallfors Open	Södermanland	300,000	(Sweden) Klas Hallgren	NGL

== Order of Merit ==
The Order of Merit was based on tournament results during the season, calculated using a points-based system.

Position	Player	Points
1	(Sweden) Petter Bocian	200,684
2	(Sweden) Åke Nilsson	186,670
3	(Denmark) Oliver Suhr	168,854
4	(Sweden) Johan Bjerhag	146,301
5	(Sweden) Gustav Adell	141,978

== See also ==
- 2008 Danish Golf Tour
- 2008 Finnish Tour
- 2008 Swedish Golf Tour (women)
