= 2012 Challenge Tour =

Golf tour season

2012 Challenge Tour season
- Duration: 26 January 2012 – 27 October 2012
- Number of official events: 26
- Most wins: (Sweden) Kristoffer Broberg (4)
- Rankings: (Norway) Espen Kofstad

The 2012 Challenge Tour was the 24th season of the Challenge Tour, the official development tour to the European Tour.

== Schedule ==
The following table lists official events during the 2012 season.

Date	Tournament	Host country	Purse (€)	Winner (Note: The number in brackets after each winner's name is the number of Challenge Tour events they had won up to and including that tournament. This information is only shown for Challenge Tour members. It is rare for someone to accumulate many wins on the Challenge Tour as success at this level usually leads to promotion to the European Tour.)	OWGR points	Other tours (Note: DNK − Danish Golf Tour; EUR − European Tour; PGTI − Professional Golf Tour of India.)	Notes
29 Jan	Gujarat Kensville Challenge	India	200,000	(Germany) Maximilian Kieffer (1)	12	PGTI	
11 Mar	Pacific Rubiales Colombia Classic	Colombia	190,000	(England) Phillip Archer (3)	12		New tournament
1 Apr	Barclays Kenya Open	Kenya	195,000	(England) Seve Benson (3)	12		
13 May	Allianz Open Côtes d'Armor Bretagne	France	160,000	(England) Eddie Pepperell (1)	12		
13 May	Madeira Islands Open - Portugal	Portugal	675,000	(Portugal) Ricardo Santos (2)	18	EUR	
27 May	Telenet Trophy	Belgium	160,000	(Italy) Marco Crespi (1)	12		
3 Jun	Fred Olsen Challenge de España	Spain	160,000	(Spain) Eduardo de la Riva (1)	12		
10 Jun	Kärnten Golf Open	Austria	160,000	(France) Gary Stal (1)	12		
17 Jun	Saint-Omer Open	France	500,000	(South Africa) Darren Fichardt (1)	18	EUR	
24 Jun	Scottish Hydro Challenge	Scotland	220,000	(England) Sam Walker (3)	12		
30 Jun	Challenge Provincia di Varese	Italy	165,000	(Scotland) Raymond Russell (1)	12		New tournament
15 Jul	Credit Suisse Challenge	Switzerland	160,000	(France) Gary Stal (2)	12		
21 Jul	Double Tree by Hilton Acaya Open	Italy	160,000	(Norway) Espen Kofstad (1)	12		
29 Jul	English Challenge	England	160,000	(England) Chris Paisley (1)	12		
5 Aug	Finnish Challenge	Finland	170,000	(Sweden) Kristoffer Broberg (1)	12		
12 Aug	Norwegian Challenge	Norway	175,000	(Sweden) Kristoffer Broberg (2)	12		
18 Aug	ECCO Tour Championship	Denmark	DKr 1,200,000	(Italy) Alessandro Tadini (4)	12	DNK	
25 Aug	Rolex Trophy	Switzerland	190,000	(Sweden) Kristoffer Broberg (3) (Note: Broberg earned immediate promotion to the European Tour, as this was his third win of the season.)	12		
9 Sep	M2M Russian Challenge Cup	Russia	200,000	(France) Alexandre Kaleka (2)	12		
16 Sep	Kazakhstan Open	Kazakhstan	400,000	(Scotland) Scott Henry (1)	12		
23 Sep	Allianz Golf Open Toulouse Metropole	France	160,000	(France) Julien Brun (a) (1)	12		
30 Sep	Challenge de Catalunya	Spain	160,000	(United States) Brooks Koepka (1)	12		New tournament
7 Oct	Allianz Open de Lyon	France	160,000	(Scotland) Chris Doak (1)	12		
14 Oct	D+D Real Czech Challenge Open	Czech Republic	160,000	(Denmark) Andreas Hartø (3)	12		New tournament
21 Oct	Crowne Plaza Copenhagen Challenge	Denmark	140,000	(Sweden) Kristoffer Broberg (4)	12		New tournament
27 Oct	Apulia San Domenico Grand Final	Italy	330,000	(Norway) Espen Kofstad (2)	16		Flagship event

== Rankings ==
The rankings were based on prize money won during the season, calculated in Euros. The top 21 players on the rankings earned status to play on the 2013 European Tour. (Note: Magnus A. Carlsson (6th) was already exempt via the 2012 Race to Dubai; status was extended to the player ranked 21st (Daniel Brooks).)

Rank	Player	Prize money (€)
1	(Norway) Espen Kofstad	131,099
2	(Sweden) Kristoffer Broberg	126,508
3	(Denmark) Andreas Hartø	121,999
4	(Denmark) Joachim B. Hansen	120,085
5	(England) Gary Lockerbie	117,482
