= Lehal =

Lehal (also spelled as Laihl, Lahel) is a surname. Notable people with the surname include:

- A.S. Lehal (born 1981), Indian golfer
- Gurpreet Singh Lehal (born 1963), Indian computer science professor
