= 2018 Swedish Golf Tour =

Golf tour season

2018 Swedish Golf Tour season
- Duration: 24 February 2018 – 13 October 2018
- Number of official events: 14
- Order of Merit: (Sweden) Jacob Glennemo

The 2018 Swedish Golf Tour was the 35th season of the Swedish Golf Tour, the main professional golf tour in Sweden since it was formed in 1984, with most tournaments being incorporated into the Nordic Golf League since 1999.

== Schedule ==
The following table lists official events during the 2018 season.

Date	Tournament	Location	Purse (SKr)	Winner (Note: The number in brackets after each winner's name is the number of Swedish Golf Tour events they had won up to and including that tournament. As most Swedish Golf Tour events are incorporated into the Nordic Golf League schedule, details of these wins are displayed there instead.)	Main tour (Note: NGL − Nordic Golf League.)
26 Feb	Lumine Lakes Open	Spain	€55,000	(Sweden) Sebastian Söderberg	NGL
3 Mar	Lumine Hills Open	Spain	€55,000	(Norway) Kristian Krogh Johannessen	NGL
19 May	Stora Hotellet Bryggan Fjällbacka Open	Bohuslän	400,000	(Denmark) Mathias Gladbjerg	NGL
25 May	Pärnu Bay Golf Links Challenge	Estonia	400,000	(Sweden) Martin Eriksson	NGL
10 Jun	PGA Championship	Skåne	375,000	(Denmark) Morten Toft Hansen (a)	NGL
21 Jun	Gamle Fredrikstad Open	Norway	350,000	(Sweden) Pontus Stjärnfeldt	NGL
30 Jun	SM Match	Uppland	400,000	(Denmark) Christian Gløët	NGL
7 Jul	Camfil Nordic Championship	Södermanland	350,000	(Denmark) Søren Schulze Pettersson	NGL
10 Aug	OnePartnerGroup Open	Västergötland	350,000	(Sweden) Sebastian Hansson	NGL
17 Aug	Holtsmark Open	Norway	350,000	(Sweden) Jacob Glennemo	NGL
25 Aug	Åhus KGK Pro-Am	Skåne	650,000	(Denmark) Benjamin Poke	NGL
8 Sep	Bråviken Open	Östergötland	350,000	(Sweden) Hampus Bergman	NGL
27 Sep	Ekerum Öland Masters	Öland	350,000	(Denmark) Marcus Helligkilde	NGL
13 Oct	Tourfinalen	Skåne	300,000	(Sweden) Jacob Glennemo	NGL

== Order of Merit ==
The Order of Merit was based on tournament results during the season, calculated using a points-based system.

Position	Player	Points
1	(Sweden) Jacob Glennemo	269,908
2	(Sweden) Martin Eriksson	246,871
3	(Sweden) Sebastian Hansson	204,071
4	(Norway) Aksel Olsen	188,713
5	(Denmark) Benjamin Poke	177,651

== See also ==
- 2018 Danish Golf Tour
- 2018 Swedish Golf Tour (women)
