= Rotterdam International Open =

Tournament information
- Location: Vlaardingen, Netherlands
- Established: 2005
- Course: Golfclub Broekpolder
- Par: 72
- Length: 7,009 yards (6,409 m)
- Tour: Challenge Tour
- Format: Stroke play
- Prize fund: €115,000
- Month played: September
- Final year: 2005

Tournament record score
- Aggregate: 275 Per G. Nyman (2005)
- To par: −13 as above

Final champion
- (Sweden) Per G. Nyman
- Location in the Netherlands

The Rotterdam International Open was a golf tournament on the Challenge Tour in 2005. It was played at Golfclub Broekpolder in Vlaardingen, Netherlands.

== Winners ==
Year	Winner	Score	To Par	Margin of victory	Runners-up	Ref.
2005	(Sweden) Per G. Nyman	275	−13	1 stroke	(Wales) Kyron Sullivan (Wales) Craig Williams	
