= 2018 Nordic Golf League =

Golf tour season

2018 Nordic Golf League season
- Duration: 13 February 2018 – 13 October 2018
- Number of official events: 26
- Most wins: (Sweden) Jacob Glennemo (3)
- Order of Merit: (Norway) Aksel Olsen

The 2018 Nordic Golf League was the 20th season of the Nordic Golf League, a third-tier tour recognised by the European Tour.

== Schedule ==
The following table lists official events during the 2018 season.

Date	Tournament	Host country	Purse	Winner (Note: The number in brackets after each winner's name is the number of Nordic Golf League events they had won up to and including that tournament. It is rare for someone to accumulate many wins on the Nordic Golf League as success at this level usually leads to promotion to the Challenge Tour.)	OWGR points
15 Feb	Mediter Real Estate Masters	Spain	DKr 375,000	(Denmark) Joachim B. Hansen (2)	4
20 Feb	PGA Catalunya Resort Championship	Spain	DKr 375,000	(Norway) Aksel Olsen (1)	4
26 Feb	Lumine Lakes Open	Spain	€55,000	(Sweden) Sebastian Söderberg (3)	4
3 Mar	Lumine Hills Open	Spain	€55,000	(Norway) Kristian Krogh Johannessen (3)	4
27 Apr	Bravo Tours Open	Denmark	DKr 300,000	(Denmark) Nicolai Højgaard (a) (1)	4
4 May	Willis Towers Watson Masters	Denmark	€40,000	(Denmark) Frederik Dreier (1)	4
10 May	Master of the Monster	Germany	€30,000	(Sweden) Per Längfors (4)	6
19 May	Stora Hotellet Bryggan Fjällbacka Open	Sweden	SKr 400,000	(Denmark) Mathias Gladbjerg (2)	4
25 May	Pärnu Bay Golf Links Challenge	Estonia	SKr 400,000	(Sweden) Martin Eriksson (1)	4
1 Jun	Jyske Bank PGA Championship	Denmark	DKr 300,000	(Sweden) Jacob Glennemo (5)	4
10 Jun	PGA Championship	Sweden	SKr 375,000	(Denmark) Morten Toft Hansen (a) (1)	4
14 Jun	12 Twelve Championship	Denmark	DKr 300,000	(Denmark) Christian Gløët (2)	4
21 Jun	Gamle Fredrikstad Open	Norway	SKr 350,000	(Sweden) Pontus Stjärnfeldt (1)	4
30 Jun	SM Match	Sweden	SKr 400,000	(Denmark) Christian Gløët (3)	4
7 Jul	Camfil Nordic Championship	Sweden	SKr 350,000	(Denmark) Søren Schulze Pettersson (1)	4
3 Aug	Made in Denmark Qualifier	Denmark	DKr 300,000	(Denmark) Nicolai Tinning (2)	4
10 Aug	OnePartnerGroup Open	Sweden	SKr 350,000	(Sweden) Sebastian Hansson (2)	4
17 Aug	Holtsmark Open	Norway	SKr 350,000	(Sweden) Jacob Glennemo (6)	4
25 Aug	Åhus KGK Pro-Am	Sweden	SKr 650,000	(Denmark) Benjamin Poke (3)	4
1 Sep	Timberwise Finnish Open	Finland	€50,000	(Sweden) Stefan Idstam (1)	4
8 Sep	Bråviken Open	Sweden	SKr 350,000	(Sweden) Hampus Bergman (1)	4
14 Sep	Tinderbox Charity Challenge	Denmark	DKr 300,000	(Denmark) Peter Launer Bæk (1)	4
21 Sep	Harboe Open	Denmark	€40,000	(Sweden) Gustav Adell (5)	4
27 Sep	Ekerum Öland Masters	Sweden	SKr 350,000	(Denmark) Marcus Helligkilde (1)	4
7 Oct	Race to HimmerLand	Denmark	DKr 300,000	(Norway) Aksel Olsen (2)	4
13 Oct	Tourfinalen	Sweden	SKr 300,000	(Sweden) Jacob Glennemo (7)	4

== Order of Merit ==
The Order of Merit was titled as the Road to Europe and was based on tournament results during the season, calculated using a points-based system. The top five players on the Order of Merit (not otherwise exempt) earned status to play on the 2019 Challenge Tour.

Position	Player	Points	Status earned
1	(Norway) Aksel Olsen	48,181	Promoted to Challenge Tour
2	(Sweden) Jacob Glennemo	44,375	Promoted to Challenge Tour
3	(Denmark) Benjamin Poke	32,116	Promoted to Challenge Tour
4	(Denmark) Martin Simonsen	31,222	Qualified for Challenge Tour (made cut in Q School)
5	(Denmark) Marcus Helligkilde	30,668	Promoted to Challenge Tour
6	(Denmark) Christian Gløët	29,097	Qualified for Challenge Tour (made cut in Q School)
7	(Sweden) Martin Eriksson	27,734	Promoted to Challenge Tour
8	(Denmark) Frederik Dreier	25,412	
9	(Denmark) Mathias Gladbjerg	25,249	
10	(Denmark) Peter Launer Bæk	21,619	

== See also ==
- 2018 Danish Golf Tour
- 2018 Swedish Golf Tour
