= Oliver Lindell =

Finnish professional golfer (born 1998)

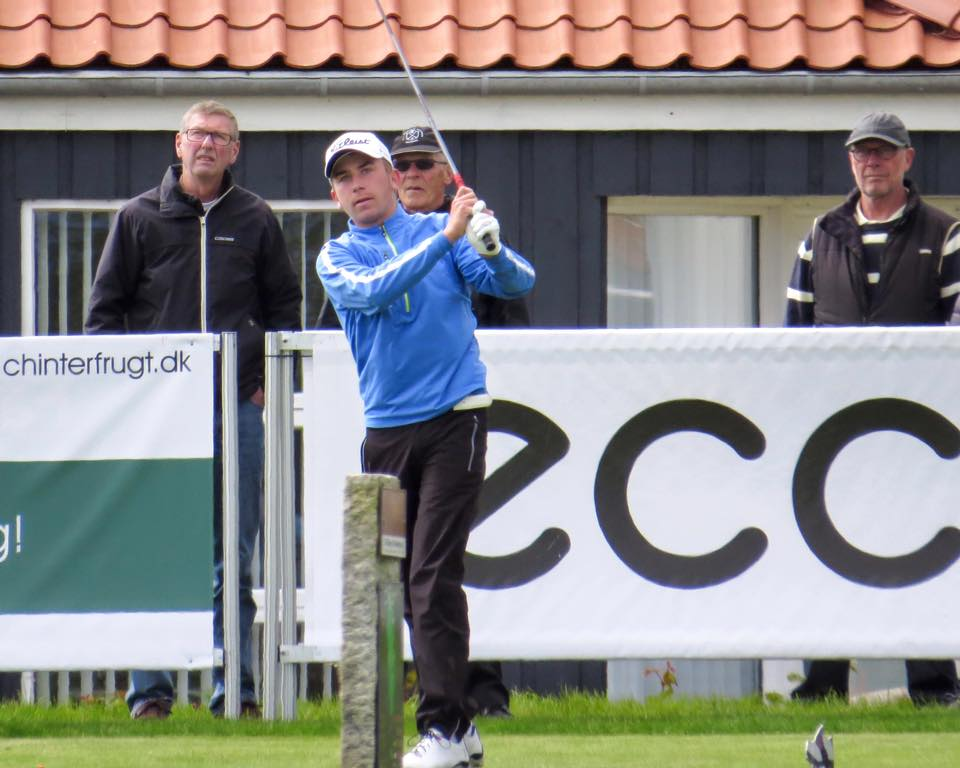

Personal information
- Nationality: Finland
- Born: 29 September 1998 (age 28) Porvoo, Finland
- Height: 179 cm (5 ft 10 in)

Career
- Sport: Golf
- Turned professional: 2016
- Current tours: PGA Tour; European Tour
- Former tours: Challenge Tour; Nordic Golf League; Danish Golf Tour; Finnish Tour
- Professional wins: 4
- Highest ranking: 93 (15 November 2026) (as of 15 November 2026)

Best results in major championships
- Masters Tournament: DNP
- PGA Championship: DNP
- U.S. Open: DNP
- The Open Championship: T28: 2025

Achievements and awards
- Finnish Junior Golfer of the Year: 2013, 2014, 2015
- Danish Golf Tour Order of Merit winner: 2016

Oliver Lindell (born 29 September 1998) is a Finnish professional golfer and European Tour player. He was runner-up at the 2026 KLM Open.

== Amateur career ==
Lindell was born in Porvoo, Finland, and represents Virvik Golf. He dominated junior golf in Finland, and was named Junior Golfer of the Year three years in a row. He represented Finland at the 2014 Summer Youth Olympics, where he finished 5th.

In 2015, he won the Duke of York Young Champions Trophy at Prince's Golf Club, Sandwich. He also won the Master Promo Championship, a Nordic Golf League event held in Turku.

== Professional career ==
Lindell turned professional ahead of the 2016 season and joined the Nordic Golf League. He won twice and finished second on the rankings behind Mark Haastrup, to earn promotion to the 2017 Challenge Tour. He topped the Danish Golf Tour rankings, and was also awarded Player of the Year and Rookie of the Year on that tour.

Lindell played on the Challenge Tour from 2017 to 2024. In his rookie season, he recorded six top-10s, including a season best 4th place at Cordon Golf Open in France. In his first start of 2017, he made a hole-in-one at the Magical Kenya Open and won a car. In the pro-am at the 2018 Vierumäki Finnish Challenge, he shot a 59.

Lindell then recorded only five top-10s in the next six seasons, including a tie for 3rd at the Euram Bank Open, before enjoying a breakout season in 2024, where he finished second at the Danish Golf Challenge, D+D Real Czech Challenge and Hangzhou Open. He recorded eight consecutive top-10s and four consecutive top-5s on his way to finish 3rd in the rankings and earn promotion to the 2025 European Tour.

In 2026, Lindell was runner-up at the KLM Open, a stroke behind winner Eugenio Chacarra.

== Amateur wins ==
- 2015 Duke of York Young Champions Trophy

== Professional wins (4) ==
=== Nordic Golf League wins (3) ===
No.	Date	Tournament	Winning score	Margin of victory	Runner-up
1	25 Jul 2015	Master Promo Championship (as an amateur)	−12 (69-65-70=204)	3 strokes	(Sweden) Niclas Hellberg
2	6 May 2016	Kitchen Joy Championship	−13 (66-68-69=203)	2 strokes	(Denmark) Nicolaj Norman Hansen
3	18 Jun 2016	NorthSide Charity Challenge	−18 (62-64-72=198)	1 stroke	(Finland) Linus Väisänen

=== Finnish Tour wins (1) ===
No.	Date	Tournament	Winning score	Margin of victory	Runner-up
1	2 Aug 2020	Finnish Tour IV	−10 (66-70-67=203)	2 strokes	(Finland) Alex Hietala

== Results in major championships ==
Tournament	2025
Masters Tournament	
PGA Championship	
U.S. Open	
The Open Championship	T28

Did not play

"T" = tied

== Team appearances ==
Amateur

- Youth Olympic Games (representing Finland): 2014
- Duke of York Young Champions Trophy (representing Finland): 2015

== See also ==
- 2024 Challenge Tour graduates
- 2026 Race to Dubai dual card winners
