= 2008 Nordic Golf League =

Golf tour season

2008 Nordic Golf League season
- Duration: 28 April 2008 – 26 October 2008
- Number of official events: 31
- Most wins: (Sweden) Petter Bocian (2)
- Order of Merit: (Sweden) Petter Bocian

The 2008 Nordic Golf League was the 10th season of the Nordic Golf League, a third-tier tour recognised by the European Tour.

== Schedule ==
The following table lists official events during the 2008 season.

Date	Tournament	Host country	Purse	Winner (Note: The number in brackets after each winner's name is the number of Nordic Golf League events they had won up to and including that tournament. It is rare for someone to accumulate many wins on the Nordic Golf League as success at this level usually leads to promotion to the Challenge Tour.)	Other tours (Note: CHA − Challenge Tour.)
29 Apr	ECCO Tour Qualification	Denmark	DKr 150,000	(Denmark) Steven Chad (1)	
3 May	Brundtland Open	Denmark	DKr 225,000	(Denmark) Peter Møller Hansen (1)	
10 May	Telenor Masters	Sweden	SKr 300,000	(Sweden) Petter Bocian (2)	
24 May	PayEx Masters	Norway	SKr 300,000	(Sweden) Kalle Edberg (1)	
25 May	Løgstør Parkhotel Masters	Denmark	€40,000	(Denmark) Nicolai Bech (1)	
31 May	FGT Opening	Finland	€15,000	(Finland) Joachim Altonen (1)	
31 May	Söderby Masters	Sweden	SKr 300,000	(Sweden) Pehr Magnebrant (1)	
1 Jun	Danfoss Masters	Denmark	DKr 300,000	(Finland) Jaakko Mäkitalo (5)	
7 Jun	Kristianstad Masters	Sweden	SKr 300,000	(Sweden) Fredrik Hammarberg (1)	
8 Jun	Cutter & Buck Open	Norway	€15,000	(Norway) Marius Thorp (2)	
15 Jun	Husqvarna Open	Sweden	SKr 500,000	(Sweden) Johan Bjerhag (2)	
19 Jun	Österlen Masters	Sweden	SKr 350,000	(Sweden) Petter Bocian (3)	
22 Jun	Unibake Masters	Denmark	€40,000	(Norway) Thomas Nielsen (2)	
22 Jun	Nordialog Open	Norway	€15,000	(Norway) Markus Leanderson (1)	
13 Jul	FGT 3	Finland	€15,000	(Finland) Tuomas Pollari (1)	
27 Jul	Hansabanka Baltic Open	Latvia	€50,000	(Sweden) Per Barth (2)	
9 Aug	Pensum Invitational	Sweden	SKr 400,000	(Denmark) Oliver Suhr (1)	
10 Aug	Kivitippu Pro-Am	Finland	€30,000	(Finland) Janne Mommo (2)	
17 Aug	Estatum Masters	Denmark	€40,000	(Norway) Eirik Tage Johansen (3)	
17 Aug	FGT 4	Finland	€15,000	(Finland) Ossi Mikkola (1)	
22 Aug	SM Match	Sweden	SKr 300,000	(Sweden) Åke Nilsson (4)	
31 Aug	Gant Open	Finland	SKr 300,000	(Sweden) Jens Dantorp (1)	
31 Aug	ECCO Tour Championship	Denmark	€180,000	(Finland) Antti Ahokas (3)	CHA
14 Sep	P4 Open	Norway	€15,000	(Scotland) Paul Blaikie (2)	
14 Sep	Landskrona Masters	Sweden	SKr 300,000	(Sweden) Anders Sjöstrand (1)	
21 Sep	FGT Final	Estonia	€15,000	(Finland) Kalle Samooja (a) (1)	
21 Sep	Visma Masters	Denmark	€50,000	(Sweden) Magnus Persson Atlevi (1)	
27 Sep	PGA Landmann Open	Sweden	SKr 400,000	(Sweden) Jonas Enander-Hedin (1)	
4 Oct	Volkswagen Open	Sweden	SKr 300,000	(Sweden) Klas Hallgren (1)	
22 Oct	ECCO Tour Qualification	Denmark	DKr 225,000	(Denmark) Thorbjørn Olesen (1)	
26 Oct	Nickent Golf Invitational Pro-Am	Denmark	€40,000	(Denmark) Thomas Nørret (2)	

== Order of Merit ==
The Order of Merit was based on tournament results during the season, calculated using a points-based system. The top five players on the Order of Merit (not otherwise exempt) earned status to play on the 2009 Challenge Tour.

Position	Player	Points	Status earned
1	(Sweden) Petter Bocian	24,510	Promoted to Challenge Tour
2	(Sweden) Åke Nilsson	23,821	Qualified for European Tour (Top 30 in Q School)
3	(Denmark) Oliver Suhr	22,428	Promoted to Challenge Tour
4	(Norway) Eirik Tage Johansen	19,791	Qualified for European Tour (Top 30 in Q School)
5	(Sweden) Gustav Adell	18,227	Promoted to Challenge Tour
6	(Finland) Jaakko Mäkitalo	17,578	Finished in Top 80 of Challenge Tour Rankings
7	(Denmark) Michael Jürgensen	16,319	Promoted to Challenge Tour
8	(Sweden) Johan Bjerhag	15,521	Promoted to Challenge Tour
9	(Sweden) Anders Sjöstrand	15,059	
10	(Sweden) Lars Johansson	14,095	

== See also ==
- 2008 Danish Golf Tour
- 2008 Finnish Tour
- 2008 Swedish Golf Tour
