= James Heath (golfer) =

English professional golfer

Personal information
- Full name: James Joseph Heath
- Nationality: England
- Born: 17 March 1983 (age 43) London, England
- Height: 6 ft 0 in (1.83 m)

Career
- Sport: Golf
- College: Augusta State University
- Turned professional: 2004
- Current tour: European Tour
- Former tour: Challenge Tour
- Professional wins: 3

Number of wins by tour
- Challenge Tour: 2
- Other: 1

Best results in major championships
- Masters Tournament: DNP
- PGA Championship: DNP
- U.S. Open: DNP
- The Open Championship: CUT: 2016

James Joseph Heath (born 17 March 1983) is an English professional golfer.

== Early life and amateur career ==
In 1983, Heath was born in London. He started playing golf with his father at the age of 10. Heath played in the Faldo Junior Series as a youth.

Heath went on to a successful amateur career. In 2004, he won the English Amateur and Lytham Trophy. At the Lytham Trophy he broke the previous scoring record by 10 strokes. Heath also played the three events on the European Tour as an amateur.

== Professional career ==
In 2004, Heath turned professional. In 2005, he joined the second tier Challenge Tour. Heath was moderately successful in his first season and finished 23rd on the Order of Merit. At the end of the year, Heath was unsuccessful at European Tour Qualifying School. In 2006, he played on the Challenge Tour once more. He won his first professional title at the ECCO Tour Championship in Denmark on his way to 14th in the Challenge Tour Rankings. He earned rights to play to the European Tour in 2007.

In 2007, Heath's rookie season on the European Tour was largely unsuccessful although he did manage two top ten finishes in minor events. In 2008, he returned to he was back on the Challenge Tour.

== Amateur wins ==
- 1999 McGregor Trophy
- 2001 Golf Illustrated Gold Vase
- 2002 Greek Amateur Open Championship, Faldo Junior Series
- 2004 English Amateur, Lytham Trophy

== Professional wins (3) ==
=== Challenge Tour wins (2) ===
No.	Date	Tournament	Winning score	Margin of victory	Runner-up
1	27 Aug 2006	ECCO Tour Championship^{1}	−19 (65-67-67-62=261)	3 strokes	(Denmark) Thomas Nørret
2	26 Jun 2016	SSE Scottish Hydro Challenge	−21 (68-62-65-68=263)	2 strokes	(New Zealand) Ryan Fox

^{1}Co-sanctioned by the Nordic Golf League

=== PGA EuroPro Tour wins (1) ===
No.	Date	Tournament	Winning score	Margin of victory	Runners-up
1	2 Oct 2010	Marfin Popular Bank EuroPro Tour Championship	−7 (68-68-67=203)	Playoff	(England) Lawrence Dodd, (England) Kevin Harper

== Team appearances ==
Amateur

- Jacques Léglise Trophy (representing Great Britain & Ireland): 2001
- European Youths' Team Championship (representing England): 2004
- Bonallack Trophy (representing Europe): 2004
- Eisenhower Trophy (representing England): 2004
- St Andrews Trophy (representing Great Britain & Ireland): 2004 (winners)

== See also ==
- 2006 Challenge Tour graduates
- 2013 European Tour Qualifying School graduates
- 2017 European Tour Qualifying School graduates
