= 2014 Nordic Golf League =

Golf tour season

2014 Nordic Golf League season
- Duration: 23 February 2014 – 11 October 2014
- Number of official events: 26
- Most wins: (Sweden) Jesper Billing (4)
- Order of Merit: (Sweden) Jacob Glennemo

The 2014 Nordic Golf League was the 16th season of the Nordic Golf League, a third-tier tour recognised by the European Tour.

== Schedule ==
The following table lists official events during the 2014 season.

Date	Tournament	Host country	Purse	Winner (Note: The number in brackets after each winner's name is the number of Nordic Golf League events they had won up to and including that tournament. It is rare for someone to accumulate many wins on the Nordic Golf League as success at this level usually leads to promotion to the Challenge Tour.)
25 Feb	Winter Series Lakes Open	Spain	€45,000	(Denmark) Rasmus Hjelm Nielsen (2)
2 Mar	Winter Series Hills Open	Spain	€45,000	(Denmark) Lars Johansen (1)
23 Mar	La Manga Club Championship	Spain	€50,000	(Finland) Kalle Samooja (2)
28 Mar	Mediter Real Estate Masters	Spain	€60,000	(Sweden) Steven Jeppesen (3)
2 May	DAT Masters	Denmark	DKr 300,000	(Sweden) Jacob Glennemo (2)
10 May	Bravo Tours Open	Denmark	DKr 300,000	(Sweden) Christopher Feldborg Nielsen (1)
18 May	Stora Hotellet Bryggan Fjällbacka Open	Sweden	SKr 400,000	(Sweden) Jesper Billing (3)
25 May	Landskrona Masters PGA Championship	Sweden	SKr 400,000	(Sweden) Fredrik Gustavsson (1)
30 May	Jyske Bank PGA Championship	Denmark	DKr 375,000	(Sweden) Marcus Larsson (2)
6 Jun	Actona Championship	Denmark	DKr 300,000	(Denmark) Nicolai Kristensen (a) (1)
14 Jun	Wisby Open	Sweden	SKr 400,000	(Sweden) Jesper Billing (4)
19 Jun	Nordea Challenge	Norway	€40,000	(Norway) Elias Bertheussen (1)
28 Jun	Ejner Hessel Championship	Denmark	DKr 300,000	(Denmark) Nicolai Kristensen (a) (2)
4 Jul	Katrineholm Open	Sweden	SKr 400,000	(Sweden) Jesper Billing (5)
12 Jul	Gant Open	Finland	€40,000	(Denmark) Christian Gløët (1)
26 Jul	Finnish Open	Finland	€60,000	(Norway) Elias Bertheussen (2)
3 Aug	Made in Denmark European Tour Qualifier	Germany	€50,000	(Sweden) Jesper Gaardsdal (1)
9 Aug	Isaberg Open	Sweden	SKr 350,000	(Sweden) Daniel Jennevret (1)
15 Aug	SM Match	Sweden	SKr 400,000	(Denmark) Patrick O'Neill (1)
24 Aug	Landeryd Masters	Sweden	SKr 435,000	(Sweden) Henric Sturehed (1)
5 Sep	Willis Masters	Denmark	DKr 300,000	(Sweden) Oscar Zetterwall (1)
13 Sep	Haverdal Open	Sweden	SKr 350,000	(Sweden) Jacob Glennemo (3)
19 Sep	Kitchen Joy Championship	Denmark	DKr 300,000	(Sweden) Jesper Billing (6)
27 Sep	Lindahl Masters	Sweden	SKr 400,000	(Sweden) Sebastian Hansson (1)
4 Oct	Race to HimmerLand	Denmark	DKr 450,000	(Sweden) Jacob Glennemo (4)
11 Oct	Tourfinal Svedala Open	Sweden	SKr 450,000	(Denmark) Mads Søgaard (1)

== Order of Merit ==
The Order of Merit was titled as the Road to Europe and was based on tournament results during the season, calculated using a points-based system. The top five players on the Order of Merit earned status to play on the 2015 Challenge Tour.

Position	Player	Points	Status earned
1	(Sweden) Jacob Glennemo	64,988	Promoted to Challenge Tour
2	(Sweden) Jesper Billing	60,628	Promoted to Challenge Tour
3	(Sweden) Steven Jeppesen	39,559	Promoted to Challenge Tour
4	(Norway) Elias Bertheussen	34,398	Promoted to Challenge Tour
5	(Sweden) David Palm	30,131	Promoted to Challenge Tour
6	(Sweden) Oscar Zetterwall	27,344	
7	(Denmark) Rasmus Hjelm Nielsen	26,721	
8	(Sweden) Christopher Feldborg Nielsen	25,099	
9	(Denmark) Mads Søgaard	23,062	Qualified for Challenge Tour (made cut in Q School)
10	(Denmark) Christian Gløët	22,435	Qualified for Challenge Tour (made cut in Q School)

== See also ==
- 2014 Danish Golf Tour
- 2014 Swedish Golf Tour
