= Antti Ahokas =

Finnish professional golfer (born 1985)

Personal information
- Full name: Antti Juhani Ahokas
- Nationality: Finland
- Born: 24 January 1985 (age 41) Lappeenranta, Finland
- Height: 1.90 m (6 ft 3 in)
- Weight: 187 lb (85 kg; 13.4 st)

Career
- Sport: Golf
- College: University of Minnesota
- Turned professional: 2006
- Current tour: Challenge Tour
- Former tour: European Tour
- Professional wins: 7

Number of wins by tour
- Challenge Tour: 2
- Other: 5

Antti Juhani Ahokas (born 24 January 1985) is a Finnish professional golfer.

== Early life and amateur career ==
Ahokas was born in Lappeenranta. After winning the Finnish Amateur Stroke Play Championship in 2005, he moved to the United States to attend the University of Minnesota, but left after just 3 months to return to Europe and further his ambitions as a professional.

In 2006, Ahokas won the Irish Amateur Open Stroke Play Championship defeating Rory McIlroy in a playoff.

== Professional career ==
In 2006, Ahokas turned professional. He failed to come through at European Tour qualifying school and joined the second-tier Challenge Tour for the 2007 season. In 2008, he won for the first time at the Abierto VISA de la Republica, becoming the first left-hander to take that title. Later in the season, he won again at the ECCO Tour Championship, and gained promotion the elite European Tour by ending the season ranked 19th on the money list.

== Amateur wins ==
- 2004 Finnish Amateur Match Play Championship, Finnish Amateur International Open Championship
- 2005 Finnish Amateur Stroke Play Championship
- 2006 Irish Amateur Open Championship

== Professional wins (7) ==
=== Challenge Tour wins (2) ===
| No. | Date | Tournament | Winning score | Margin of victory | Runner(s)-up |
|---|---|---|---|---|---|
| 1 | 6 Apr 2008 | Abierto Visa de la República^{1} | −10 (67-66-66-71=270) | 3 strokes | (Argentina) Martin Monguzzi |
| 2 | 31 Aug 2008 | ECCO Tour Championship^{2} | −17 (67-69-65-70=271) | 1 stroke | (Netherlands) Wil Besseling, (Norway) Eirik Tage Johansen, (Finland) Roope Kakko, (Netherlands) Taco Remkes |

^{1}Co-sanctioned by the Tour de las Américas and the TPG Tour
^{2}Co-sanctioned by the Nordic Golf League

=== Nordic Golf League wins (4) ===
| No. | Date | Tournament | Winning score | Margin of victory | Runner(s)-up |
|---|---|---|---|---|---|
| 1 | 12 Jun 2005 | Sonera Open (as an amateur) | −12 (68-69-67=204) | 5 strokes | (Finland) Heikki Mäntylä |
| 2 | 9 Sep 2006 | Gant Open | −2 (71-65-75=211) | 1 stroke | (Finland) Sakari Sauli Aho |
| 2 | 31 Aug 2008 | ECCO Tour Championship^{1} | −17 (67-69-65-70=271) | 1 stroke | (Netherlands) Wil Besseling, (Norway) Eirik Tage Johansen, (Finland) Roope Kakko, (Netherlands) Taco Remkes |
| 4 | 8 Jul 2017 | Lannalodge Open | −9 (68-65-68=201) | 2 strokes | (Iceland) Axel Bóasson |

^{1}Co-sanctioned by the Challenge Tour

=== Finnish Tour wins (2) ===
| No. | Date | Tournament | Winning score | Margin of victory | Runner-up |
|---|---|---|---|---|---|
| 1 | 15 Aug 2004 | SM Reikäpeli (as an amateur) | 19 holes | | (Finland) Ari Pasanen |
| 2 | 15 Jun 2013 | Finnish Tour Paltamo | −3 (74-69-70=213) | Playoff | (Finland) Olli Järvi |

== Team appearances ==
Amateur

- European Boys' Team Championship (representing Finland): 2002, 2003
- Jacques Léglise Trophy (representing the Continent of Europe): 2002
- European Youths' Team Championship (representing Finland): 2004, 2006
- Eisenhower Trophy (representing Finland): 2004, 2006
- European Amateur Team Championship (representing Finland): 2005
- European Youths' Team Championship (representing Finland): 2004, 2006
- Bonallack Trophy (representing Europe): 2006 (winners)
- St Andrews Trophy (representing the Continent of Europe): 2006

== See also ==
- 2008 Challenge Tour graduates
