= Per G. Nyman =

Swedish professional golfer

Personal information
- Full name: Per Göran Nyman
- Nationality: Sweden
- Born: 3 May 1974 (age 52) Växjö, Sweden
- Height: 1.78 m (5 ft 10 in)
- Weight: 78 kg (172 lb; 12.3 st)
- Spouse: Jenny Nyman (née Bergenholtz)
- Children: 2

Career
- Sport: Golf
- Turned professional: 1995
- Former tour: Challenge Tour
- Professional wins: 4

Number of wins by tour
- Challenge Tour: 2
- Other: 2

Per Göran Nyman (born 3 May 1974) is a Swedish professional golfer.

Nyman was born in Växjö. An ice hockey goal minder from the age of four, he began playing golf as a 13-year-old because he lived near the Växjö Golf Course, where he looked up to European Tour professional Klas Eriksson. Nyman claimed his second Challenge Tour victory when he won the Rotterdam International Open in September 2005.

== Hickory career ==
After retiring from the tours, he started playing a lot of hickory golf.

== Professional wins (4) ==
=== Challenge Tour wins (2) ===
No.	Date	Tournament	Winning score	Margin of victory	Runners-up
1	13 Jun 1999	NCC Open	−7 (72-68-71-70=281)	Playoff	(Sweden) Klas Eriksson, (Denmark) Thomas Nørret
2	18 Sep 2005	Rotterdam International Open	−13 (65-71-66-73=275)	1 stroke	(Wales) Kyron Sullivan, (Wales) Craig Williams

Challenge Tour playoff record (1–0)

No.	Year	Tournament	Opponents	Result
1	1999	NCC Open	(Sweden) Klas Eriksson, (Denmark) Thomas Nørret	Won with bogey on second extra hole Nørret eliminated by par on first hole

=== Nordic Golf League wins (2) ===
No.	Date	Tournament	Winning score	Margin of victory	Runner(s)-up
1	5 Aug 2005	Willis Open	−14 (69-67-66=202)	4 strokes	(Sweden) Lars Edvinson, (Sweden) Pontus Leijon, (Norway) Morten Orveland, (Sweden) Raimo Sjöberg
2	14 Oct 2006	Scanplan Tour Final	−4 (74-71-67=212)	1 stroke	(Norway) Eirik Tage Johansen
