= Matthew Richardson (golfer) =

English professional golfer

Personal information
- Nationality: England
- Born: 5 December 1984 (age 41) Worcester, England
- Height: 6 ft 2 in (1.88 m)
- Weight: 195 lb (88 kg; 13.9 st)

Career
- Sport: Golf
- Turned professional: 2005
- Former tours: European Tour; Web.com Tour; PGA Tour Canada
- Professional wins: 1

Best results in major championships
- Masters Tournament: DNP
- PGA Championship: DNP
- U.S. Open: T77: 2010
- The Open Championship: 80th: 2005

Matthew Richardson (born 5 December 1984) is an English professional golfer played in both Europe and North America.

== Early life and amateur career ==
In 1984, Richardson was born in Worcester, England. Richardson had success as an amateur golfer. The highlight of his career was an appearance at the 2005 Walker Cup.

== Professional career ==
In 2005, Richardson turned professional. He qualified for the European Tour at the end of 200.

Shortly thereafter, Richardson moved to North America and began playing on the Canadian Tour. In 2009 he qualified for the second-tier Nationwide Tour, with a best finish of third in the Mexico Open. In 2010, Richardson qualified for his first professional major, the U.S. Open, and secured a return to the Nationwide Tour. He is also played on the PGA Tour Canada in 2012 and 2013.

== Amateur wins ==
- 2002 Peter McEvoy Trophy, World Junior Championships
- 2004 European Amateur, Brabazon Trophy

== Professional wins (1) ==
=== PGA EuroPro Tour wins (1) ===
No.	Date	Tournament	Winning score	Margin of victory	Runner-up
1	25 Aug 2006	Sweeney's Environmental Classic	−12 (65-66-64=195)	3 strokes	(England) Sandeep Grewal

== Results in major championships ==
Tournament	2005	2006	2007	2008	2009	2010	2011
U.S. Open						T77	CUT
The Open Championship	80						

Note: Richardson never played in the Masters Tournament or the PGA Championship.

Did not play

CUT = missed the half-way cut
"T" = tied

== Team appearances ==
Amateur

- European Boys' Team Championship (representing England): 2002
- Jacques Léglise Trophy (representing Great Britain and Ireland): 2002 (winners)
- European Youths' Team Championship (representing England): 2004
- Eisenhower Trophy (representing England): 2004
- St Andrews Trophy (representing Great Britain & Ireland): 2004 (winners)
- European Amateur Team Championship (representing England): 2005 (winners)
- Walker Cup (representing Great Britain & Ireland): 2005

== See also ==
- 2006 European Tour Qualifying School graduates
