= Andreas Hartø =

Danish professional golfer

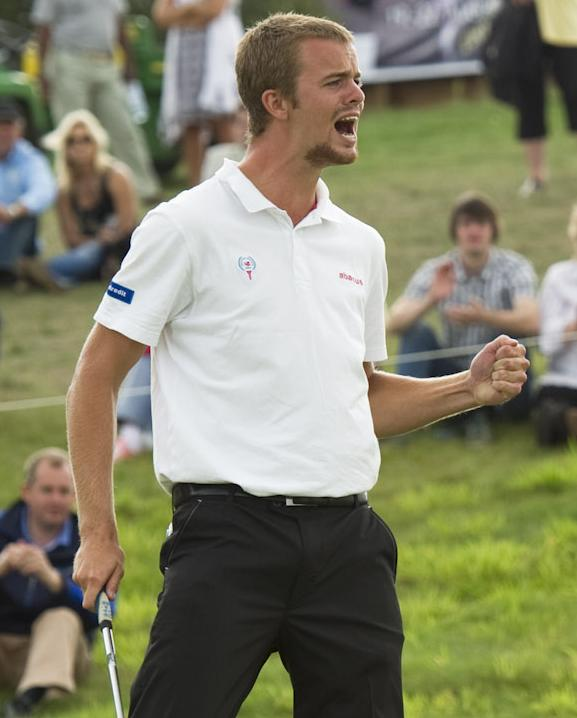

Personal information
- Nationality: Denmark
- Born: 26 July 1988 (age 38) Copenhagen, Denmark
- Height: 1.91 m (6 ft 3 in)
- Weight: 78 kg (172 lb; 12.3 st)

Career
- Sport: Golf
- Turned professional: 2010
- Current tour: Challenge Tour
- Former tour: European Tour
- Professional wins: 3

Number of wins by tour
- Challenge Tour: 3

Best results in major championships
- Masters Tournament: DNP
- PGA Championship: DNP
- U.S. Open: CUT: 2011
- The Open Championship: DNP

Andreas Hartø (born 26 July 1988) is a Danish professional golfer.

== Career ==
In August 2010, Hartø became just the fourth amateur to win on the European Challenge Tour when he captured the ECCO Tour Championship. He turned professional later in 2010, winning on the Challenge Tour for a second time in October of that year. This was still only his fourth event on the tour, making him the quickest ever to two wins at that level. On 10 December 2010, he qualified for the European Tour 2011 season, at the European Tour Qualifying School held at PGA Catalunja Resort in Spain. He picked up his third victory on the Challenge Tour in 2012 at the D+D Real Czech Challenge Open.

== Amateur wins ==
- 2009 Welsh Open Amateur Stroke Play Championship

== Professional wins (3) ==
=== Challenge Tour wins (3) ===
| No. | Date | Tournament | Winning score | Margin of victory | Runner-up |
|---|---|---|---|---|---|
| 1 | 22 Aug 2010 | ECCO Tour Championship^{1} (as an amateur) | −8 (68-72-70-74=284) | 1 stroke | (Sweden) Oscar Florén |
| 2 | 16 Oct 2010 | Roma Golf Open | −19 (66-65-65-69=265) | Playoff | (Sweden) Joel Sjöholm |
| 3 | 14 Oct 2012 | D+D Real Czech Challenge Open | −24 (65-67-67-65=264) | 3 strokes | (Denmark) Joachim B. Hansen |

^{1}Co-sanctioned by the Danish Golf Tour

Challenge Tour playoff record (1–0)

| No. | Year | Tournament | Opponent | Result |
|---|---|---|---|---|
| 1 | 2010 | Roma Golf Open | (Sweden) Joel Sjöholm | Won with birdie on first extra hole |

== Results in major championships ==
| Tournament | 2011 |
|---|---|
| U.S. Open | CUT |

CUT = missed the half-way cut
Note: Hartø only played in the U.S. Open.

== Team appearances ==
Amateur

- European Amateur Team Championship (representing Denmark): 2009, 2010

== See also ==
- 2010 European Tour Qualifying School graduates
- 2012 Challenge Tour graduates
- 2013 European Tour Qualifying School graduates
