= Eirik Tage Johansen =

Norwegian professional golfer

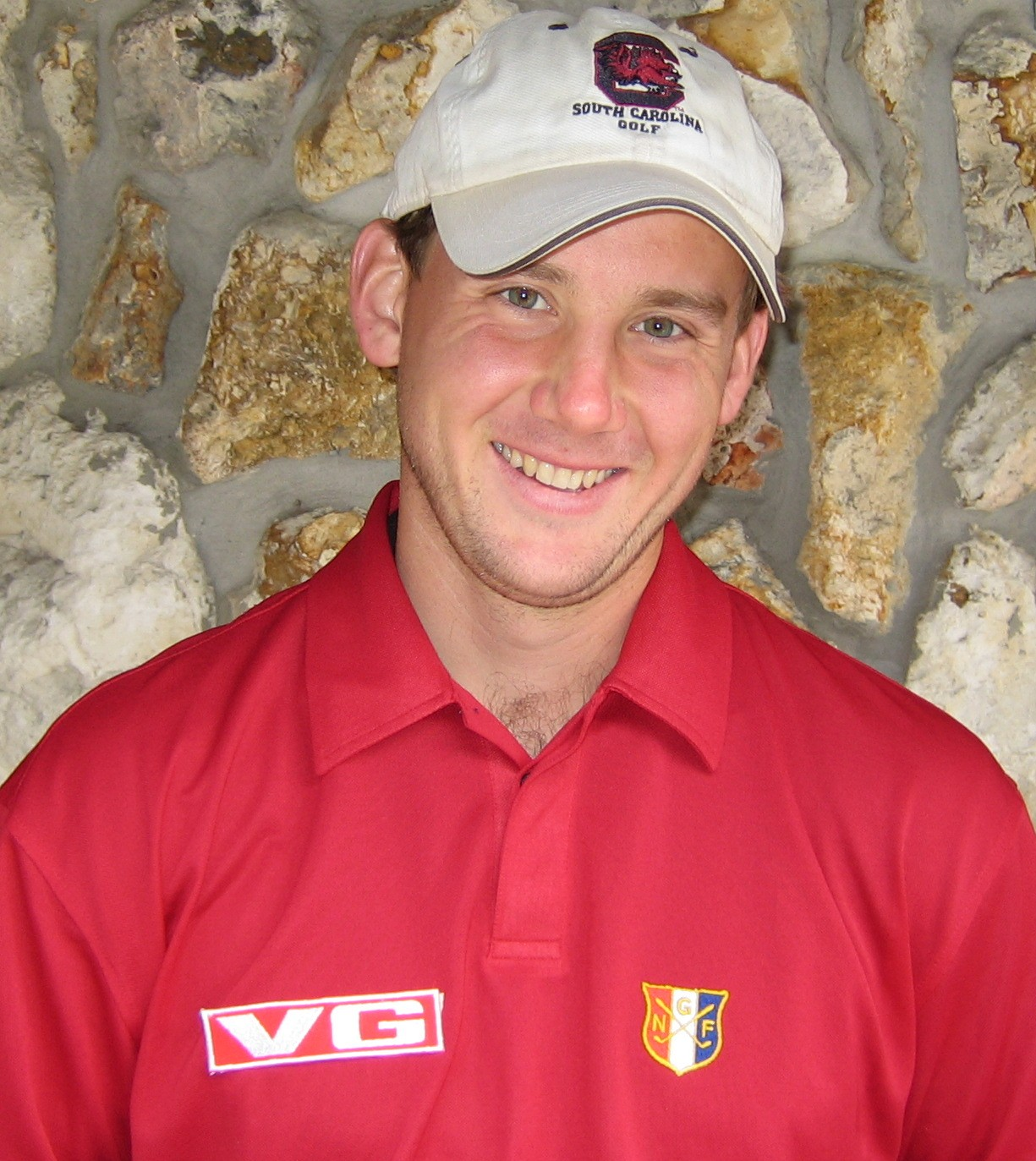

Personal information
- Nationality: Norway
- Born: 23 May 1982 (age 44) Ventura, California, U.S.
- Height: 6 ft 1.5 in (1.87 m)
- Weight: 173 lb (78 kg; 12.4 st)

Career
- Sport: Golf
- College: University of South Carolina
- Turned professional: 2006
- Current tour: Challenge Tour
- Former tour: European Tour
- Professional wins: 6

Number of wins by tour
- Challenge Tour: 1
- Other: 5

Achievements and awards
- Norwegian Golf Tour Order of Merit winner: 2006
- Danish Golf Tour Order of Merit winner: 2008

Eirik Tage Johansen (born 23 May 1982) is a Norwegian professional golfer.

== Career ==
Johansen was born in the United States, and returned to the country of his birth as a successful amateur golfer, taking up a golf scholarship at the University of South Carolina, where he was a member of the golf team. After graduating in 2006, he turned professional, and immediately won a place on the European Tour after advancing through qualifying school. After a disappointing first season, he dropped down to the second-tier Challenge Tour for 2008, but was once again successful at qualifying school at the end of that season. Johansen has retained his place on the European Tour from 2009 to 2011, although he had to return to qualifying school every year.

Johansen also has four wins on the Scandinavian Nordic Golf League; the first of these was while still an amateur.

== Amateur wins ==
- 2001 Norwegian Amateur
- 2003 Norwegian Amateur

== Professional wins (6) ==
=== Challenge Tour wins (1) ===
No.	Date	Tournament	Winning score	Margin of victory	Runner-up
1	23 Jun 2019	Andalucía Costa del Sol Match Play 9	2 and 1		(France) Ugo Coussaud

=== Nordic Golf League wins (4) ===
No.	Date	Tournament	Winning score	Margin of victory	Runner(s)-up
1	27 Jun 2004	Hydro-Texaco Open (as an amateur)	−15 (66-69-66=201)	2 strokes	(Norway) Jan-Are Larsen
2	9 Jul 2006	Interspons Open	+9 (75-73-77=225)	1 stroke	(Norway) Ofeigur Johann Gudjonson
3	17 Aug 2008	Estatum Masters	−6 (70-68-69=207)	3 strokes	(Denmark) Kristian Grud, (Denmark) Thomas Nørret
4	26 Feb 2015	Lumine Hills Open	−7 (74-67-67=208)	1 stroke	(Sweden) Eric Blom

=== Norwegian Golf Tour wins (1) ===
No.	Date	Tournament	Winning score	Margin of victory	Runner-up
1	8 Aug 2004	Norwegian National Golf Championship (as an amateur)	−12 (69-67-67-73=276)	5 strokes	(Norway) Thomas Hansen

== Team appearances ==
Amateur

- Jacques Léglise Trophy (representing the Continent of Europe): 1999
- Eisenhower Trophy (representing Norway): 2000, 2004
- European Amateur Team Championship (representing Norway): 2001, 2003, 2005

== See also ==
- 2006 European Tour Qualifying School graduates
- 2008 European Tour Qualifying School graduates
- 2009 European Tour Qualifying School graduates
- 2010 European Tour Qualifying School graduates
