= A.S. Lehal =

Indian professional golfer

Personal information
- Full name: Amarbir Singh Lehal
- Nationality: India
- Born: 6 March 1981 (age 45) Chandigarh, India

Career
- Sport: Golf
- Turned professional: 2005
- Current tour: Professional Golf Tour of India

Amarbir Singh Lehal (born 6 March 1981) is an Indian professional golfer.

== Career ==
Lehal has a successful amateur career which included runner-up finishes in several prestigious tournaments, such as the All-India Amateur.

In 2005, Lehal turned professional and competes on the Professional Golf Tour of India, which has allowed him to play in several Asian Tour events. His best finish in an Asian Tour co-sanctioned tournament was tied for 34th place in the 2005 Hero Honda Indian Open.

== Team appearances ==
Amateur

- Eisenhower Trophy (representing India): 2004
- Nomura Cup: 2003
