= Jens Dantorp =

Swedish professional golfer (born 1989)

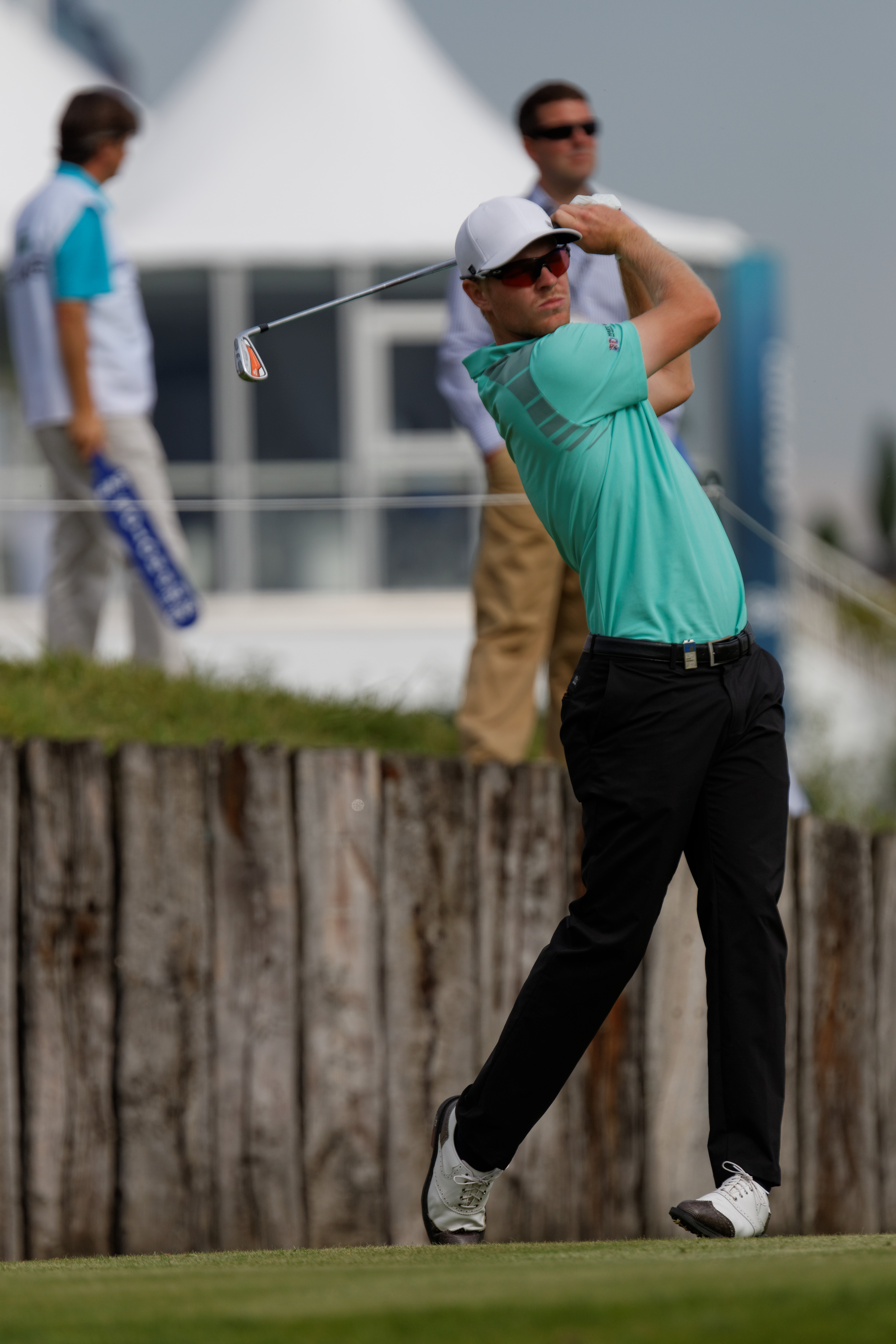

Personal information
- Full name: Jens Morgan Dantorp
- Nationality: Sweden
- Born: 28 April 1989 (age 37) Malmö, Sweden
- Height: 1.83 m (6 ft 0 in)
- Weight: 73 kg (161 lb; 11.5 st)
- Spouse: Emma

Career
- Sport: Golf
- Turned professional: 2008
- Current tour: European Tour
- Former tours: Challenge Tour; Nordic Golf League
- Professional wins: 12

Number of wins by tour
- Challenge Tour: 3
- Other: 9

Best results in major championships
- Masters Tournament: DNP
- PGA Championship: DNP
- U.S. Open: CUT: 2023
- The Open Championship: CUT: 2018

Achievements and awards
- Swedish Golf Tour Order of Merit winner: 2011
- Danish Golf Tour Order of Merit winner: 2011
- Nordic Golf League Order of Merit winner: 2011

Jens Morgan Dantorp (born 28 April 1989) is a Swedish professional golfer who currently plays on the European Tour. He has won three times on the Challenge Tour and was runner-up at the 2023 Soudal Open.

== Professional career ==
=== Early years ===
Dantorp was born in Malmö in 1989 and attended Malmö Idrottsakademi. He turned professional after graduating in 2008 and honed his game on the Nordic Golf League, rather than taking the popular U.S college route. He soon found success and collected eight titles in five years. In 2011, he won three consecutive tournaments in Denmark, and shot a 59 in the process. He topped the 2011 Order of Merit ahead of Kristoffer Broberg, earning promotion to the 2012 Challenge Tour.

In 2013, Dantorp picked up his first Challenge Tour title at the Rolex Trophy, beating Adrián Otaegui by a stroke. At the end of year he came through Q-school to qualify for the European Tour. He finished his rookie season 154th in the rankings and returned to the Challenge Tour, where he did progressively better over the next three years.

In 2015, Dantorp tied for 3rd at the Nordea Masters, in one of only two European Tour starts that season. He finished runner-up at the Kärnten Golf Open in Austria and finished 24th in the Challenge Tour Rankings. In 2016, he was runner-up in the season-ending NBO Golf Classic Grand Final a stroke behind Bernd Ritthammer and finished 19th in the rankings. In 2017 he won the Ras Al Khaimah Golf Challenge, holing out for an eagle three at the first playoff hole to beat Adrian Meronk. He finished tied for 5th place in the NBO Golf Classic Grand Final the following week, to end the season 11th in the rankings and gain a place on the 2018 European Tour.

=== European Tour ===
In 2018, Dantorp held the lead after three rounds of the Scottish Open at Gullane, eventually finishing tied third behind Brandon Stone and Eddie Pepperell, and earning a spot in the 2018 Open Championship ahead of Trevor Immelman by virtue of higher world ranking.

Dantorp was tied for second, one stroke off the lead, heading into the final round at the 2022 Cazoo Classic in England. He shot a final day 73 to finish in tied 8th place, four strokes behind winner Richie Ramsay.

In 2023, Dantorp battled with compatriot Simon Forsström for the Soudal Open title in Belgium over the final nine holes. He took the outright lead after a 48-foot birdie putt dropped on the 13th hole, and set the clubhouse target at 16-under-par, but Forsström birded the 16th and 17th to win by a stroke.

Dantorp earned a spot at the 2023 U.S. Open in the qualifier at Walton Heath Golf Club in England. A few weeks later, he tied for 3rd at the Barracuda Championship in California, a PGA Tour co-sanctioned event.

== Personal life ==
Dantorp is married to Emma Eksell, a Gothenburg native who played college golf at Morehead State University.

== Amateur wins ==
- 2007 Swedish Junior Strokeplay Championship

== Professional wins (12) ==
=== Challenge Tour wins (3) ===
| No. | Date | Tournament | Winning score | Margin of victory | Runner-up |
|---|---|---|---|---|---|
| 1 | 25 Aug 2013 | Rolex Trophy | −18 (67-67-66-70=270) | 1 stroke | (Spain) Adrián Otaegui |
| 2 | 28 Oct 2017 | Ras Al Khaimah Golf Challenge | −15 (71-69-65-68=273) | Playoff | (Poland) Adrian Meronk |
| 3 | 22 May 2022 | Challenge de España | −10 (74-71-67-66=278) | 3 strokes | (Spain) Victor Pastor |

Challenge Tour playoff record (1–0)

| No. | Year | Tournament | Opponent | Result |
|---|---|---|---|---|
| 1 | 2017 | Ras Al Khaimah Golf Challenge | (Poland) Adrian Meronk | Won with eagle on first extra hole |

=== Nordic Golf League wins (8) ===
| No. | Date | Tournament | Winning score | Margin of victory | Runner(s)-up |
|---|---|---|---|---|---|
| 1 | 31 Aug 2008 | Gant Open | −11 (72-65-68=205) | 2 strokes | (Sweden) Klas Hallgren |
| 2 | 1 May 2009 | St Ibb Open | 40 pts (10-17-13=40) | 11 points | (Sweden) Lars Johansson |
| 3 | 11 Jun 2011 | Sturup Park Masters | −11 (71-66-68=205) | 1 stroke | (Sweden) Peter Hanson |
| 4 | 9 Sep 2011 | Bravo Tours Open | −15 (73-59-66=198) | 2 strokes | (Denmark) Morten Ørum Madsen |
| 5 | 24 Sep 2011 | Golf Experten Open | 21 pts (10-9-2=21) | 4 points | (Sweden) Joakim Bäckström, (Sweden) Niclas Johansson, (Denmark) Steen Ottosen |
| 6 | 8 Oct 2011 | Backtee Race to HimmerLand | −10 (68-66-66=200) | Playoff | (Sweden) Mattias Eliasson, (Sweden) Jacob Glennemo, (Denmark) Kristian Grud |
| 7 | 17 May 2012 | Elisefarm Open | −5 (69-72-70=211) | 2 strokes | (Sweden) Jesper Kennegård |
| 8 | 6 Oct 2012 | Backtee Race to HimmerLand (2) | −11 (74-65-66=205) | 4 strokes | (Sweden) Niclas Johansson |

=== Hi5 Pro Tour wins (1) ===
| No. | Date | Tournament | Winning score | Margin of victory | Runner-up |
|---|---|---|---|---|---|
| 1 | 23 Feb 2012 | Hacienda Riquelme Open | −10 (71-65-70=206) | 1 stroke | (England) Eddie Pepperell |

== Results in major championships ==
Results not in chronological order before 2019 and in 2020.

| Tournament | 2018 | 2019 | 2020 | 2021 | 2022 | 2023 |
|---|---|---|---|---|---|---|
| Masters Tournament | | | | | | |
| PGA Championship | | | | | | |
| U.S. Open | | | | | | CUT |
| The Open Championship | CUT | | NT | | | |

Did not play

CUT = missed the half-way cut
"T" indicates a tie for a place
NT = No tournament due to the COVID-19 pandemic

== Team appearances ==
Amateur

- European Boys' Team Championship (representing Sweden): 2007

== See also ==
- 2013 European Tour Qualifying School graduates
- 2017 Challenge Tour graduates
- 2022 Challenge Tour graduates
