= 2004 Eisenhower Trophy =

Tournament information
- Dates: 28–31 October
- Location: Río Grande, Puerto Rico; 18.2223°N 66.4303°W
- Courses: Rio Mar Country Club; River and Ocean courses
- Format: 72 holes stroke play

Statistics
- Par: 72 (River); 72 (Ocean)
- Field: 66 teams 198 players

Champion
- United States; Spencer Levin, Ryan Moore & Lee Williams
- 407 (−25)
- Location in the Caribbean Location in Puerto Rico

The 2004 Eisenhower Trophy took place 28–31 October at Rio Mar Country Club in Río Grande, Puerto Rico. It was the 24th World Amateur Team Championship for the Eisenhower Trophy. The tournament was a 72-hole stroke play team event with 66 three-man teams. The best two scores for each round counted towards the team total. Each team was due to play two rounds on the two courses. The leading teams played on the River course on the third day and were due to play on the Ocean course on the final day.

Heavy rain and lightning caused the final day to be abandoned and the event was reduced to 54 holes. The leading 36 teams had played their third round on the River course while the others played on the Ocean course.

The United States won their 13th Eisenhower Trophy, nine strokes ahead of Spain, who took the silver medal. Sweden took the bronze medal while Canada, Italy and Switzerland finished tied for fourth place. Ryan Moore had the best 54-hole aggregate of 204, 12 under par.

The 2004 Espirito Santo Trophy was played on the same courses one week prior.

== Teams ==
66 three-man teams contested the event.

The following table lists the players on the leading teams.

Country	Players
Australia	Jarrod Lyle, James Nitties, Michael Sim
Austria	Michael Moser, Florian Praegant, Bernd Wiesberger
Canada	Craig Doell, James Lepp, Richard Scott
Chile	Benjamín Alvarado, Hugo León, Santiago Russi
Denmark	Christoffer Christiansen, Mark Haastrup, Kasper Linnet Jørgensen
England	James Heath, Matthew Richardson, Gary Wolstenholme
Finland	Antti Ahokas, Mikko Korhonen, Heikki Mäntylä
Germany	Florian Fritsch, Martin Kaymer, Max Kramer
India	Vikrant Chopra, Jaskirat Dullet, Amarbir Singh Lehal
Ireland	Darren Crowe, Brian McElhinney, Sean McTernan
Italy	Matteo Delpodio, Edoardo Molinari, Francesco Molinari
Japan	Yuta Ikeda, Kunihiro Kamii, Takamasa Yamamoto
Malaysia	S. Siva Chandhran, Ben Leong, Sukree Othman
Netherlands	Wil Besseling, Edward de Jong, Wouter de Vries
Scotland	Jamie McLeary, George Murray, Stuart Wilson
South Africa	Norman Beggs, Matthew Kent, Dawie van der Walt
Spain	Rafa Cabrera-Bello, Alfredo García-Heredia, Álvaro Quirós
Sweden	Kalle Edberg, Oscar Florén, Alex Norén
Switzerland	Roger Furrer, Martin Rominger, Nicolas Sulzer
Thailand	Chaddanai Choksuwanlap, Pijit Petchkasem, Chinnarat Phadungsil
United States	Spencer Levin, Ryan Moore, Lee Williams
Wales	Rhys Davies, Nigel Edwards, Gareth Wright

== Results ==
Place	Country	Score	To par
1st place, gold medalist(s)	United States	132-136-139=407	−25
2nd place, silver medalist(s)	Spain	137-139-140=416	−16
3rd place, bronze medalist(s)	Sweden	138-141-138=417	−15
T4	Canada	143-143-136=422	−10
T4	Italy	136-146-140=422	−10
T4	Switzerland	137-142-143=422	−10
7	Wales	141-138-144=423	−9
T8	England	137-146-141=424	−8
T8	Malaysia	143-143-138=424	−8
T10	Denmark	143-143-139=425	−7
T10	Germany	138-145-142=425	−7
T12	Australia	142-141-145=428	−4
T12	Japan	141-143-144=428	−4
T12	Netherlands	140-147-141=428	−4
T15	Chile	143-145-142=430	−2
T15	Finland	148-142-140=430	−2
T17	Ireland	143-146-142=431	−1
T17	South Africa	147-138-146=431	−1
19	India	143-148-141=432	E
20	Austria	145-143-145=433	+1
T21	Mexico	148-141-145=434	+2
T21	New Zealand	150-144-140=434	+2
T23	France	148-142-145=435	+3
T23	Philippines	143-148-144=435	+3
T23	South Korea	144-144-147=435	+3
26	Portugal	141-150-145=436	+4
T27	Argentina	144-150-143=437	+5
T27	El Salvador	140-150-147=437	+5
T27	Iceland	142-147-148=437	+5
T27	Thailand	143-150-144=437	+5
31	Scotland	141-150-149=440	+8
32	Czech Republic	150-145-147=442	+10
33	Peru	146-145-152=443	+11
T34	Bermuda	143-150-151=444	+12
T34	Chinese Taipei	151-146-147=444	+12
T34	Norway	148-145-151=444	+12
T37	Guatemala	146-153-146=445	+13
T37	Pakistan	148-153-144=445	+13
T37	Puerto Rico	147-152-146=445	+13
T40	Colombia	148-149-149=446	+14
T40	Dominican Republic	145-151-150=446	+14
42	Brazil	150-147-151=448	+16
T43	Belgium	148-148-153=449	+17
T43	Bolivia	146-150-153=449	+17
T43	Trinidad and Tobago	149-149-151=449	+17
T43	Turkey	146-152-151=449	+17
47	Zimbabwe	151-150-149=450	+18
48	Ecuador	155-148-153=456	+24
T49	Panama	150-153-154=457	+25
T49	Venezuela	149-156-152=457	+25
51	Paraguay	156-148-154=458	+26
52	Slovenia	158-152-149=459	+27
53	Barbados	158-147-157=462	+30
54	Russia	157-154-153=464	+32
55	Slovakia	158-157-151=466	+34
56	Hong Kong	154-158-156=468	+36
57	Costa Rica	153-162-157=472	+40
T58	Cayman Islands	158-162-159=479	+47
T58	Greece	160-161-158=479	+47
60	Eswatini	168-160-157=485	+53
61	Bahamas	165-159-162=486	+54
62	Estonia	161-169-159=489	+57
63	Croatia	164-161-165=490	+58
64	United States Virgin Islands	164-163-166=493	+61
65	United Arab Emirates	162-173-159=494	+62
DQ	Egypt	156-161-DQ	

The leading 36 teams played their third round on the River course with the remaining teams playing on the Ocean course.

== Individual leaders ==
There was no official recognition for the lowest individual scores.

Place	Player	Country	Score	To par
1	Ryan Moore	United States	65-67-72=204	−12
2	Spencer Levin	United States	70-69-67=206	−10
T3	Wil Besseling	Netherlands	68-71-69=208	−8
T3	Alex Norén	Sweden	69-70-69=208	−8
T5	Benjamín Alvarado	Chile	71-69-69=209	−7
T5	Nigel Edwards	Wales	70-67-72=209	−7
T5	Josh Geary	New Zealand	72-69-68=209	−7
T5	Juvic Pagunsan	Philippines	69-70-70=209	−7
T5	Nicolas Sulzer	Switzerland	66-70-73=209	−7
T10	Craig Doell	Canada	70-73-67=210	−6
T10	Florian Fritsch	Germany	69-71-70=210	−6
T10	Alfredo García-Heredia	Spain	68-71-71=210	−6
T10	Ben Leong	Malaysia	72-69-69=210	−6
T10	Francesco Molinari	Italy	68-73-69=210	−6

Players in the leading teams played two rounds on the River course and one on the Ocean course.
