= Thomas Nørret =

Danish professional golfer (born 1974)

Personal information
- Nationality: Denmark
- Born: 17 February 1974 (age 52) Kolding, Denmark
- Height: 1.83 m (6 ft 0 in)
- Weight: 90 kg (200 lb; 14 st)
- Spouse: Mette (m. 1998)
- Children: 4

Career
- Sport: Golf
- College: Lamar University; Aalborg University
- Turned professional: 1999
- Former tours: European Tour; Challenge Tour
- Professional wins: 5

Number of wins by tour
- Challenge Tour: 1
- Other: 4

Achievements and awards
- Danish Golf Tour Order of Merit winner: 2010

Thomas Nørret (born 17 February 1974) is a Danish professional golfer.

== Career ==
Nørret became a professional golfer in 1999 at the relatively late age of 25, after he had spent time studying in both Denmark and the United States. He immediately joined the second-tier Challenge Tour and found instant success, posting two runners-up finishes in his debut season and finishing 25th in the final standings, just outside the automatic qualifiers for the European Tour. Nørret became a Challenge Tour regular over the following seasons, claiming his first win in 2002 at the Volvo Finnish Open after a six-month break, but never improved on his 1999 performance, and in 2009 he took a break from tournament golf to manage young players, returning only for a few events in 2006 and 2009. In 2010, Nørret made a comeback, playing several Challenge Tour events before progressing through qualifying school to reach the European Tour for the first time at the age of 36.

At the 2011 Austrian Golf Open on the European Tour, Nørret took a two stroke lead into the final round after shooting 9-under-par over the first three days. He then shot a final round level par to finish solo fourth, his best result on the European Tour so far.

== Professional wins (5) ==
=== Challenge Tour wins (1) ===
No.	Date	Tournament	Winning score	Margin of victory	Runner-up
1	14 Jul 2002	Volvo Finnish Open	−15 (68-68-72-65=273)	1 stroke	(Germany) Gary Birch Jr.

Challenge Tour playoff record (0–1)

No.	Year	Tournament	Opponents	Result
1	1999	NCC Open	(Sweden) Klas Eriksson, (Sweden) Per G. Nyman	Nyman won with bogey on second extra hole Nørret eliminated by par on first hole

=== Nordic Golf League wins (4) ===
No.	Date	Tournament	Winning score	Margin of victory	Runner(s)-up
1	26 Sep 2002	Wilson Open	−14 (69-68-65=202)	4 strokes	(Denmark) Jesper Lassen Nielsen
2	26 Oct 2008	Nickent Golf Invitational Pro-Am	−12 (64-68=132)	1 stroke	(Denmark) Jesper Bentsen, (Denmark) Jesper Lerchedahl
3	9 Mar 2010	La Manga Masters I	−7 (68-71-73=212)	Playoff	(Denmark) Kasper Linnet Jørgensen, (Norway) Marius Thorp
4	13 May 2010	JELD-WEN Masters	−12 (67-71-66=204)	4 strokes	(Finland) Kalle Samooja

== Team appearances ==
Amateur

- European Youths' Team Championship (representing Denmark): 1994

== See also ==
- 2010 European Tour Qualifying School graduates
- 2011 European Tour Qualifying School graduates
