= Jacob Glennemo =

Swedish professional golfer

Personal information
- Nickname: Glenn
- Nationality: Sweden
- Born: 25 May 1987 (age 39) Mariefred, Sweden

Career
- Sport: Golf
- Turned professional: 2007
- Former tours: Challenge Tour; Nordic Golf League; Swedish Golf Tour
- Professional wins: 10

Achievements and awards
- Danish Golf Tour Order of Merit winner: 2014
- Nordic Golf League Order of Merit winner: 2014
- Swedish Golf Tour Order of Merit winner: 2018

Jacob Glennemo (born 25 May 1987) is a Swedish professional golfer who played on the Challenge Tour between 2013 and 2020. He won the 2014 Nordic Golf League Order of Merit.

== Professional career ==
Glennemo turned professional in 2007 and joined the Nordic Golf League. He recorded his maiden NGL victory at the 2012 Landskrona Masters and finished 5th in the season rankings, to qualify for the Challenge Tour. As a Challenge Tour rookie in 2013 he made 7 cuts in 16 starts. He was also runner-up at the Black Mountain Invitational in Thailand behind Johan Edfors, and made his first cut on the European Tour, at the Lyoness Open in France.

In 2014, he won three tournaments and topped the Nordic Golf League Order of Merit, to again secure a Challenge Tour card. In 2016 he was tied 7th at the Najeti Open in France.

In 2018 he won three tournaments including the Swedish Golf Tour Final, and finished second in the NGL season rankings, to again earn promotion to the Challenge Tour. He won the 2018 Swedish Golf Tour Order of Merit and the associated cash bonus. In 2019, he finished tied 10th at the Italian Challenge Open.

Glennemo has recorded a 59 twice in his career, at the 2017 Race to Himmerland and at the 2020 AIK-Golfen. In 2018, he reached a career best Official World Golf Ranking rank of 382. He retired from tour following the 2020 season.

== Amateur wins ==
- 2004 Bankboken Tour Regional #5 - Sörmland
- 2005 FöreningsSparbanken Tour Riks #2 - Stockholm
- 2006 Skandia Tour Elit #5 Slag

== Professional wins (10) ==
=== Nordic Golf League wins (7) ===
No.	Date	Tournament	Winning score	Margin of victory	Runner(s)-up
1	26 Aug 2012	Landskrona Masters	−19 (65-68-64=197)	1 stroke	(Sweden) Jens Fahrbring
2	2 May 2014	DAT Masters	−8 (69-72-67=208)	1 stroke	(Sweden) Jesper Billing
3	13 Sep 2014	Haverdal Open	−8 (73-66-69=208)	3 strokes	(Sweden) Steven Jeppesen, (Sweden) Anton Wejshag, (Sweden) Joakim Wikström
4	4 Oct 2014	Race to HimmerLand	−11 (65-67-73=205)	1 stroke	(Denmark) Martin Ovesen
5	1 Jun 2018	Jyske Bank PGA Championship	−12 (66-69-69=204)	1 stroke	(Norway) Anders Strand Ellingsberg
6	28 Sep 2018	Holtsmark Open	−15 (64-69-68=201)	3 strokes	(Sweden) Sebastian Hansson
7	13 Oct 2018	Tourfinalen	−7 (68-70-71=209)	2 strokes	(Norway) Aksel Olsen

=== Other wins (3) ===
- 2007 Arninge Open
- 2008 Skyways Open
- 2012 Norrporten Open

== See also ==
- Lowest rounds of golf
