= Marius Thorp =

Norwegian professional golfer (born 1988)

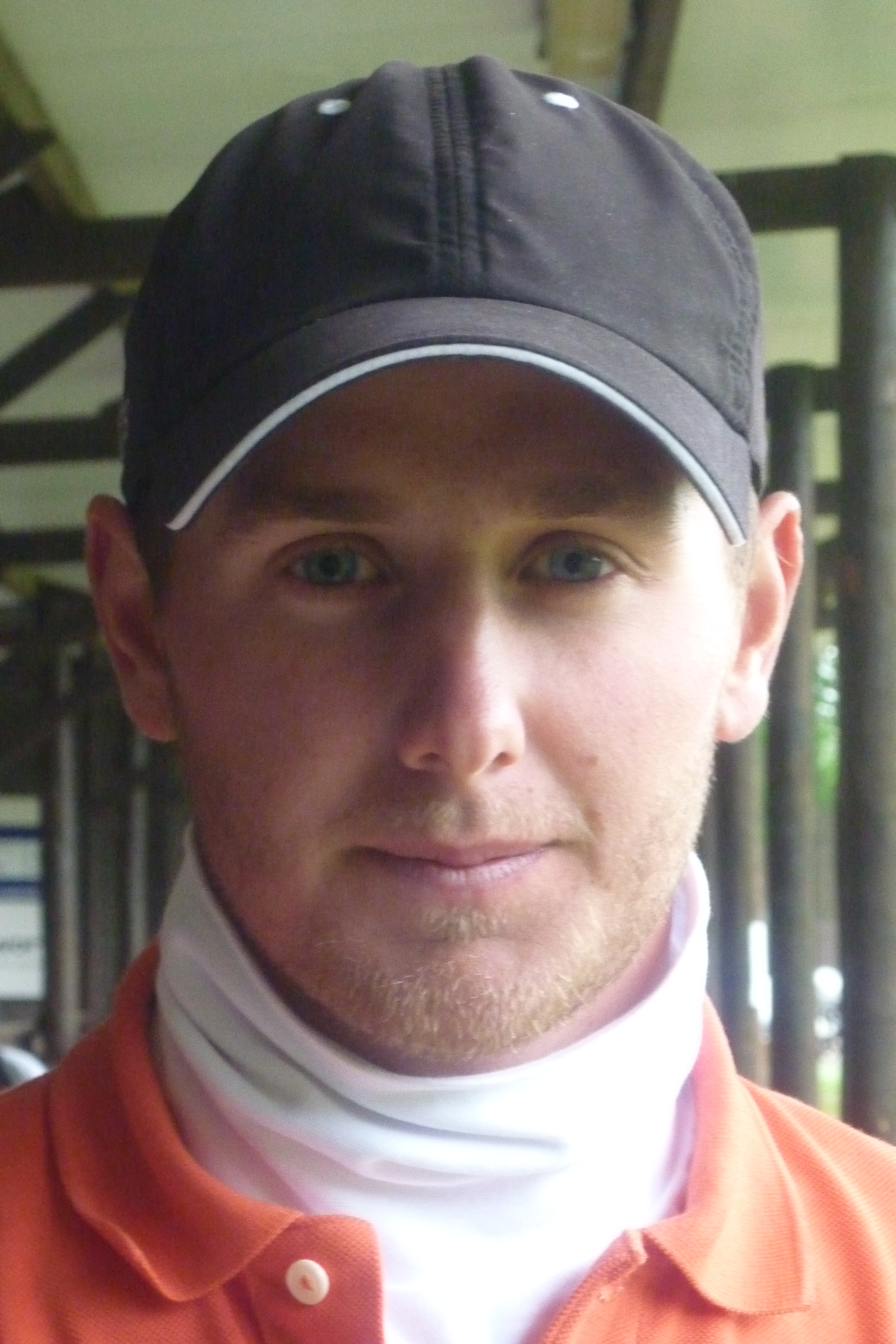

Personal information
- Nationality: Norway
- Born: 28 June 1988 (age 38) Oslo, Norway
- Height: 1.76 m (5 ft 9 in)
- Weight: 79 kg (174 lb; 12.4 st)

Career
- Sport: Golf
- Turned professional: 2007
- Former tours: European Tour; Challenge Tour; Nordic Golf League
- Professional wins: 5

Best results in major championships
- Masters Tournament: DNP
- PGA Championship: DNP
- U.S. Open: DNP
- The Open Championship: T48: 2006

Marius Thorp (born 28 June 1988) is a Norwegian professional golfer.

== Career ==
Thorp had a successful amateur career, winning the European Amateur in 2005 and claiming the silver medal for lowest amateur in the 2006 Open Championship. He turned professional in 2007 and had immediate success, claiming four wins on mini-tours in Scandinavia. In 2010 Thorp joined the Challenge Tour and found further success at that level, with six top-10s in his debut season. He ended 2010 16th in the standings, which earned him a European Tour card for 2011.

In September 2011 he announced that he was taking a break from golf, saying that his motivation and desire were no longer present.

Thorp hails from Bærum and represented the local golf club Bærum GK.

== Amateur wins ==
- 2005 European Amateur

== Professional wins (5) ==
=== Nordic Golf League wins (4) ===
No.	Date	Tournament	Winning score	Margin of victory	Runner(s)-up
1	13 May 2007	DnB NOR Open	+3 (74-74-74=222)	6 strokes	(Norway) Christian Aronsen, (Norway) Dennis Den Roover
2	8 Jun 2008	Cutter & Buck Open	−3 (65-73-75=213)	10 strokes	(Norway) Stian Hansen, (Norway) Markus Leanderson
3	19 Feb 2009	El Valle - Polaris World^{1}	−5 (74-65-69=208)	1 stroke	(Spain) Gonzalo Elena
4	22 May 2010	Willis Masters	−18 (64-67-67=198)	6 strokes	(Finland) Joonas Granberg, (Sweden) Marcus Palm, (Sweden) Joakim Rask, (Sweden) Fredric Sundberg

^{1}Co-sanctioned by the Hi5 Pro Tour

=== Hi5 Pro Tour wins (2) ===
No.	Date	Tournament	Winning score	Margin of victory	Runner-up
1	19 Feb 2009	El Valle - Polaris World^{1}	−5 (74-65-69=208)	1 stroke	(Spain) Gonzalo Elena
2	18 Feb 2010	Polaris #2 Condado Open	−7 (70-70-69=209)	3 strokes	(Sweden) Fredrik Widmark

^{1}Co-sanctioned by the Nordic Golf League

== Results in major championships ==
Tournament	2006
The Open Championship	T48_{LA}

LA = Low amateur
"T" = tied
Note: Thorp only played in The Open Championship.

== Team appearances ==
Amateur

- Junior Ryder Cup (representing Europe): 2004 (winners)
- European Boys' Team Championship (representing Norway): 2003, 2004, 2005, 2006 (winners)
- Jacques Léglise Trophy (representing Continental Europe): 2005 (winners), 2006 (winners)
- Eisenhower Trophy (representing Norway): 2006
- Bonallack Trophy (representing Europe): 2006 (winners)
- European Amateur Team Championship (representing Norway): 2007

== See also ==
- 2010 Challenge Tour graduates
