= Christopher Feldborg Nielsen =

Swedish professional golfer

Personal information
- Nationality: Sweden
- Born: 15 September 1992 (age 34) Ystad, Sweden
- Height: 6 ft 3 in (1.91 m)

Career
- Sport: Golf
- Turned professional: 2012
- Current tour: Challenge Tour
- Former tour: Nordic Golf League
- Professional wins: 7

Achievements and awards
- Nordic Golf League Order of Merit winner: 2021

Christopher Feldborg Nielsen (born 15 September 1992) is a Swedish professional golfer. He has five wins on the Nordic Golf League (NGL) and won the 2021 NGL Order of Merit to earn promotion to the Challenge Tour after he shot an albatross on the final hole of the Road to Europe Tour Final.

== Professional career ==
Feldborg Nielsen was born in Ystad, Sweden. He turned professional in 2012 and started playing on the Swedish Golf Tour. In 2013, he joined the Nordic Golf League, where his best finish was a T4 in the Danish PGA Championship.

In 2014, he won his first title, the Bravo Tours Open in Denmark, and he was runner-up in the Danish PGA Championship. He lost the final of the 2014 Swedish Matchplay Championship to Patrick O'Neill of Denmark, but walked away with the National Matchplay Champion title for which other nationals are ineligible.

In 2015, he enjoyed 6 top-5 finishes on the NGL, and in 2016 he made seven starts on the Challenge Tour, with a best finish of T20 in the Vierumäki Finnish Challenge. In 2017, he was runner-up at the Swedish PGA Championship and won the Tinderbox Charity Challenge in Denmark. He finished second on the NGL Order of Merit and was promoted to the 2018 Challenge Tour, where he made 7 cuts in 19 starts, with a best finish of T14 in the Made in Denmark Challenge.

Back on the 2019 NGL, he was runner-up at the Swedish Matchplay Championship and the Willis Towers Watson Masters in Denmark. His best finish in 2020 was a T3 at Visby Open. In 2021, he won three titles, the PGA Championship Landeryd Masters, the Timberwise Finnish Open and the Road to Europe Tour Final, to top the NGL Order of Merit and earn another promotion to the Challenge Tour.

His win at the Road to Europe Tour Final was so dramatic, it was reported on by Golf Digest, which called it "the most ludicrous finish to a golf tournament you'll ever hear". Feldborg Nielsen was two strokes off the lead as he stood on the par-5 18th tee. He hit his tee shot into the rough. He then amazingly holed his second shot from this disadvantageous lie for an albatross 2, forcing the tournament into a playoff where he triumphed.

On the 2022 Challenge Tour, he recorded top-5 finishes at the Italian Challenge Open and at the Indoor Golf Group Challenge on home soil, to finish 51st in the rankings. In 2023, he shot bogey-free round of 65, seven under par, to take a one-shot lead after day one of the Le Vaudreuil Golf Challenge in France.

== Professional wins (7) ==
=== Nordic Golf League wins (5) ===
No.	Date	Tournament	Winning score	Margin of victory	Runner-up
1	10 May 2014	Bravo Tours Open	−17 (66-63-67=196)	2 strokes	(Sweden) Pontus Ellerström
2	16 Jun 2017	Tinderbox Charity Challenge	−17 (65-68-66=199)	5 strokes	(Iceland) Haraldur Magnús
3	21 Aug 2021	PGA Championship Landeryd Masters	−4 (71-66-66-77=280)	Playoff	(Denmark) Jeppe Kristian Andersen
4	4 Sep 2021	Timberwise Finnish Open	−10 (70-72-64=206)	4 strokes	(Sweden) Joakim Wikström
5	22 Oct 2021	Road to Europe Tour Final	−2 (75-72-64=211)	Playoff	(Sweden) Adam Blommé

=== Other wins (2) ===
- 2015 Sjöbo Open
- 2019 Sjöbo Open
