= Danish Golf Tour =

Professional golf tour

- Formerly: Scanplan Tour
- Sport: Golf
- Founded: 2002
- Founder: Dan Stage; PGA of Denmark
- First season: 2003
- Countries: Based in Denmark (Note: Schedules have also included events in Finland, Germany, Latvia, Norway, Poland, Portugal, Spain and Sweden.)
- Most titles: Tournament wins: (Sweden) Jens Dantorp (4) (Sweden) Jacob Glennemo (4)
- Related competitions: Finnish Tour; Nordic Golf League; Norwegian Golf Tour; Swedish Golf Tour
- Website: https://www.eccotour.org/

The Danish Golf Tour, currently titled as the ECCO Tour for sponsorship reasons, is a developmental professional golf tour based in Denmark. Similar to the Swedish Golf Tour, most events on the Danish Golf Tour schedule are incorporated into the Nordic Golf League, one of the third-tier tours recognised by the European Tour.

== History ==
The tour was founded in 2002 as a joint venture by Dan Stage and the PGA of Denmark. The aim of the tour being to provide a new generation of golfers with optimal conditions for developing their game. The inaugural season was in 2003 where the tour hosted ten tournaments, culminating in a total prize fund of kr. 1,500,000.

The tour originally signed a three-year agreement in 2002 with Danish-based shoe manufacturer ECCO who would be the inaugural title sponsor of the tour for the first three seasons. The agreement was ceased in 2006 and Scanplan Ejendomme became the new title sponsor of the tour. This deal lasted until 2007, when ECCO was reinstated as the title sponsor for the 2008 season onwards.

The Order of Merit has commonly been titled as the Race to HimmerLand, with the final event on the schedule in recent seasons being played at the HimmerLand Golf & Spa Resort (also host to the Made in HimmerLand event on the European Tour).

== Order of Merit winners ==
Year	Winner	Points
2025	No Order of Merit awarded	
2024	No Order of Merit awarded	
2023	No Order of Merit awarded	
2022	(Denmark) Frederik Birkelund	225,727
2021	(Denmark) Peter Launer Bæk	178,563
2020	(Denmark) Marcus Helligkilde	123,066
2019	(Norway) Elias Bertheussen	146,909
2018	(Norway) Aksel Olsen	222,141
2017	(Iceland) Axel Bóasson	171,213
Year	Winner	Prize money (DKr)
2016	(Finland) Oliver Lindell	253,591
2015	(Finland) Tapio Pulkkanen	282,813
2014	(Sweden) Jacob Glennemo	280,040
2013	(Denmark) Jeff Winther	197,385
2012	(Denmark) Lucas Bjerregaard	204,438
2011	(Sweden) Jens Dantorp	290,136
2010	(Denmark) Thomas Nørret	182,119
2009	(Portugal) José-Filipe Lima	216,000
2008	(Norway) Eirik Tage Johansen	191,432
Year	Winner	Points
2007	(Sweden) Andreas Högberg	13,390
2006	(Denmark) Christoffer Lange	1,484
2005	(Sweden) Raimo Sjöberg	1,153
2004	(Sweden) Peter Viktor	1,448
2003	(Norway) Øyvind Rojahn	1,295

== See also ==
- Finnish Tour
- Nordic Golf League
- Norwegian Golf Tour
- Swedish Golf Tour
