= 2003 Swedish Golf Tour =

Golf tour season

2003 Swedish Golf Tour season
- Duration: 12 May 2003 – 10 October 2003
- Number of official events: 12
- Order of Merit: (Sweden) Leif Westerberg

The 2003 Swedish Golf Tour, titled as the 2003 Telia Tour for sponsorship reasons, was the 20th season of the Swedish Golf Tour, the main professional golf tour in Sweden since it was formed in 1984, with most tournaments being incorporated into the Nordic Golf League since 1999.

== Schedule ==
The following table lists official events during the 2003 season.

Date	Tournament	Location	Purse (SKr)	Winner (Note: The number in brackets after each winner's name is the number of Swedish Golf Tour events they had won up to and including that tournament. As most Swedish Golf Tour events are incorporated into the Nordic Golf League or Challenge Tour schedules, details of these wins are displayed there instead.)	Main tour (Note: CHA − Challenge Tour; NGL − Nordic Golf League.)
13 May	Telia Grand Opening	Västergötland	100,000	(Sweden) Pelle Edberg	NGL
18 May	Gambro Open	Skåne	200,000	(Sweden) Johan Möller (a)	NGL
25 May	Kinnaborg Open	Västergötland	200,000	(Sweden) Jimmy Kawalec	NGL
15 Jun	Husqvarna Open	Småland	300,000	(Sweden) Hampus von Post	NGL
28 Jun	SM Match	Uppland	200,000	(Sweden) Andreaz Lindberg	NGL
4 Jul	St Ibb Open	Skåne	230,000	(Sweden) Åke Nilsson	NGL
14 Aug	Sundbyholm Open	Södermanland	200,000	(Sweden) Pelle Edberg	NGL
22 Aug	Swedish International	Uppland	200,000	(Finland) Ari Savolainen (a)	NGL
31 Aug	Skandia PGA Open	Skåne	1,000,000	(South Africa) Titch Moore	CHA
6 Sep	Västerås Open	Västmanland	250,000	(Sweden) Leif Westerberg	NGL
21 Sep	Telia Grand Prix	Skåne	1,200,000	(Scotland) Euan Little	CHA
10 Oct	Telia Tourkval Kävlinge	Skåne	n/a	(Sweden) Johan Axgren (2)	

== Order of Merit ==
The Order of Merit was based on tournament results during the season, calculated using a points-based system.

Position	Player	Points
1	(Sweden) Leif Westerberg	1,035
2	(Sweden) Pelle Edberg	975
3	(Sweden) Eric Carlberg	964
4	(Sweden) Fredrik Henge	932
5	(Sweden) Christian Nilsson	782

== See also ==
- 2003 Danish Golf Tour
- 2003 Finnish Tour
- 2003 Swedish Golf Tour (women)
