= 2005 Swedish Golf Tour =

Golf tour season

2005 Swedish Golf Tour season
- Duration: 9 May 2005 – 9 October 2005
- Number of official events: 15
- Order of Merit: (Sweden) Fredrik Söderström

The 2005 Swedish Golf Tour, titled as the 2005 Telia Tour for sponsorship reasons, was the 22nd season of the Swedish Golf Tour, the main professional golf tour in Sweden since it was formed in 1984, with most tournaments being incorporated into the Nordic Golf League since 1999.

== Schedule ==
The following table lists official events during the 2005 season.

Date	Tournament	Location	Purse (SKr)	Winner (Note: The number in brackets after each winner's name is the number of Swedish Golf Tour events they had won up to and including that tournament. As most Swedish Golf Tour events are incorporated into the Nordic Golf League or Challenge Tour schedules, details of these wins are displayed there instead.)	Main tour (Note: CHA − Challenge Tour; NGL − Nordic Golf League.)
10 May	Telia Tour Opening	Halland	110,000	(Sweden) Erik Algulin	NGL
22 May	Gambro Open	Skåne	175,000	(Sweden) Jimmy Kawalec	NGL
27 May	Booz Allen Nordic Classic	Uppland	100,000	(Sweden) Linus Pettersson (1)	
5 Jun	Kinnaborg Open	Västergötland	200,000	(Sweden) Niklas Bruzelius	NGL
12 Jun	St Ibb Open	Skåne	250,000	(Sweden) Fredrik Söderström	NGL
19 Jun	Husqvarna Open	Småland	350,000	(Sweden) Hans Edberg	NGL
2 Jul	SM Match	Uppland	200,000	(Sweden) Mattias Nilsson	NGL
23 Jul	Gävle Energi Open	Gästrikland	200,000	(Finland) Panu Kylliäinen	NGL
7 Aug	Hansabanka Baltic Open	Latvia	€30,000	(Sweden) Fredrick Månsson	NGL
21 Aug	Skandia PGA Open	Uppland	1,000,000	(Scotland) David Patrick	CHA
26 Aug	Swedish International	Södermanland	200,000	(Norway) Morten Hagen	NGL
3 Sep	Västerås Open	Västmanland	250,000	(Sweden) Tony Edlund	NGL
11 Sep	Telia Challenge Waxholm	Uppland	1,000,000	(Norway) Morten Hagen	CHA
30 Sep	Telia Tour Final	Skåne	300,000	(Sweden) Fredrik Söderström (1)	
9 Oct	Öresund Masters	Skåne	600,000	(Sweden) Christian Nilsson	NGL

== Order of Merit ==
The Order of Merit was based on tournament results during the season, calculated using a points-based system.

Position	Player	Points
1	(Sweden) Fredrik Söderström	1,501
2	(Norway) Morten Hagen	1,293
3	(Sweden) Christian Nilsson	1,281
4	(Sweden) Fredrick Månsson	948
5	(Sweden) Niklas Bruzelius	937

== See also ==
- 2005 Danish Golf Tour
- 2005 Finnish Tour
- 2005 Swedish Golf Tour (women)
