= 2000 Swedish Golf Tour =

Golf tour season

2000 Swedish Golf Tour season
- Duration: 14 May 2000 – 17 September 2000
- Number of official events: 13
- Order of Merit: (Sweden) Hampus von Post

The 2000 Swedish Golf Tour, titled as the 2000 Telia Tour for sponsorship reasons, was the 17th season of the Swedish Golf Tour, the main professional golf tour in Sweden since it was formed in 1984, with most tournaments being incorporated into the Nordic Golf League since 1999.

== Schedule ==
The following table lists official events during the 2000 season.

Date	Tournament	Location	Purse (SKr)	Winner (Note: The number in brackets after each winner's name is the number of Swedish Golf Tour events they had won up to and including that tournament. As most Swedish Golf Tour events are incorporated into the Nordic Golf League or Challenge Tour schedules, details of these wins are displayed there instead.)	Main tour (Note: CHA − Challenge Tour; NGL − Nordic Golf League.)
15 May	Gula Sidorna Grand Opening	Uppland	100,000	(Sweden) Joakim Bäckström (1)	
28 May	Kinnaborg Open	Västergötland	150,000	(Sweden) Joakim Rask	NGL
4 Jun	St Ibb Open	Skåne	225,000	(Sweden) Kristofer Svensson	NGL
11 Jun	NCC Open	Skåne	750,000	(Republic of Ireland) David Higgins	CHA
18 Jun	Husqvarna Open	Småland	300,000	(Sweden) Kristofer Svensson	NGL
1 Jul	golf.se Invitational	Uppland	180,000	(Sweden) Per Larsson	NGL
29 Jul	Hook Masters	Småland	200,000	(Sweden) Jesper Björklund	NGL
12 Aug	Skandia PGA Open	Halland	400,000	(Norway) Morten Orveland	NGL
17 Aug	Sundsvall Golf Open	Medelpad	150,000	(Sweden) Fredrick Månsson	NGL
26 Aug	Västerås Open	Västmanland	250,000	(Sweden) Hampus von Post	NGL
3 Sep	SM Match	Skåne	300,000	(Sweden) Björn Pettersson	NGL
10 Sep	DFDS Tor Line Open	Halland	400,000	(Sweden) Linus Pettersson	NGL
17 Sep	Gula Sidorna Grand Prix	Skåne	1,100,000	(Sweden) Henrik Stenson	CHA

== Order of Merit ==
The Order of Merit was based on tournament results during the season, calculated using a points-based system.

Position	Player	Points
1	(Sweden) Hampus von Post	1,450
2	(Sweden) Per Larsson	1,242
3	(Sweden) Kristofer Svensson	1,122
4	(Sweden) Fredrick Månsson	906
5	(Sweden) Linus Pettersson	809

== See also ==
- 2000 Swedish Golf Tour (women)
