= 2001 Swedish Golf Tour =

Golf tour season

2001 Swedish Golf Tour season
- Duration: 13 May 2001 – 16 September 2001
- Number of official events: 14
- Order of Merit: (Sweden) Marcus Norgren

The 2001 Swedish Golf Tour, titled as the 2001 Telia Tour for sponsorship reasons, was the 18th season of the Swedish Golf Tour, the main professional golf tour in Sweden since it was formed in 1984, with most tournaments being incorporated into the Nordic Golf League since 1999.

== Schedule ==
The following table lists official events during the 2001 season.

| Date | Tournament | Location | Purse (SKr) | Winner (Note: The number in brackets after each winner's name is the number of Swedish Golf Tour events they had won up to and including that tournament. As most Swedish Golf Tour events are incorporated into the Nordic Golf League or Challenge Tour schedules, details of these wins are displayed there instead.) | Main tour (Note: CHA − Challenge Tour; NGL − Nordic Golf League.) |
|---|---|---|---|---|---|
| 14 May | Telia Grand Opening | Uppland | 100,000 | (Sweden) Jonas Runnquist (1) | |
| 20 May | Kinnaborg Open | Västergötland | 175,000 | (Sweden) Joakim Grönhagen | NGL |
| 3 Jun | NCC Open | Skåne | 840,000 | (England) Benn Barham | CHA |
| 10 Jun | St Ibb Open | Skåne | 225,000 | (Sweden) Björn Pettersson | NGL |
| 17 Jun | Husqvarna Open | Småland | 300,000 | (Sweden) Johan Bjerhag | NGL |
| 30 Jun | Match golf.se | Uppland | 200,000 | (Sweden) Björn Bäck | NGL |
| 15 Jul | Sundbyholm Open | Södermanland | 250,000 | (Sweden) Joakim Bäckström | NGL |
| 11 Aug | Sundsvall Golf Open | Medelpad | 175,000 | (Sweden) Marcus Norgren | NGL |
| 16 Aug | TietoEnator Open | Värmland | 175,000 | (Sweden) Jesper Björklund | NGL |
| 26 Aug | Skandia PGA Open | Skåne | 800,000 | (France) Christophe Pottier | CHA |
| 2 Sep | SM Match | Skåne | 300,000 | (Sweden) Fredrik Widmark | NGL |
| 8 Sep | Västerås Open | Västmanland | 250,000 | (Sweden) Fredrick Månsson | NGL |
| 16 Sep | Telia Grand Prix | Uppland | 1,100,000 | (Wales) Jamie Donaldson | CHA |

== Order of Merit ==
The Order of Merit was based on tournament results during the season, calculated using a points-based system.

| Position | Player | Points |
|---|---|---|
| 1 | (Sweden) Marcus Norgren | 879 |
| 2 | (Sweden) Björn Bäck | 831 |
| 3 | (Sweden) Björn Pettersson | 798 |
| 4 | (Sweden) Fredrick Månsson | 747 |
| 5 | (Sweden) Johan Bjerhag | 745 |

== See also ==
- 2001 Swedish Golf Tour (women)
