= Norwegian Golf Tour =

Professional golf tour

- Formerly: P4 Tour; Galvin Green Tour
- Sport: Golf
- Founded: 2004
- Founder: Norwegian Golf Federation; PGA of Norway
- First season: 2004
- Folded: 2009
- Countries: Based in Norway
- Related competitions: Danish Golf Tour; Finnish Tour; Nordic Golf League; Swedish Golf Tour

The Norwegian Golf Tour was a developmental professional golf tour based in Norway. In the past, similar to the Danish Golf Tour and the Swedish Golf Tour, most events on the Norwegian Golf Tour schedules were incorporated into the Nordic Golf League, one of the four third-tier tours recognized by the European Tour.

== History ==
The tour was founded in 2004 by the Norwegian Golf Federation and the PGA of Norway. The tour aimed to offer a series of tournaments for elite-level golfers in Norway (both amateur and professional). The inaugural title sponsor of the tour was P4 Radio Hele Norge.

== 2007 season ==
=== Schedule ===
The following table lists official events during the 2007 season.

Date	Tournament	Location	Purse (€)	Winner (Note: The number in brackets after each winner's name is the number of Norwegian Golf Tour events they had won up to and including that tournament. As most Norwegian Golf Tour events were incorporated into the Nordic Golf League or Challenge Tour schedules, details of these wins are displayed there instead.)	Main tour (Note: CHA − Challenge Tour; NGL − Nordic Golf League.)
13 May	DnB NOR Open	Vestland	15,000	(Norway) Marius Thorp	NGL
27 May	PayEx Masters	Viken	25,000	(Sweden) Tony Edlund	NGL
1 Jul	Nordialog Open	Viken	15,000	(Sweden) Fredrick Månsson	NGL
12 Aug	Norwegian National Golf Championship	Viken	15,000	(Norway) Lars Brovold (1)	
19 Aug	Lexus Open	Viken	130,000	(Austria) Martin Wiegele	CHA
9 Sep	Sony Ericsson Open	Vestfold og Telemark	25,000	(Denmark) Peter Ankersø	NGL

== 2006 season ==
=== Schedule ===
The following table lists official events during the 2006 season.

Date	Tournament	Location	Purse (€)	Winner	Main tour
7 May	DnB NOR Open	Rogaland	15,000	(Norway) Jan-Are Larsen	NGL
21 May	Fujitsu-Siemens Open	Viken	15,000	(Norway) Martin Dahl	NGL
18 Jun	Lexus Open	Vestfold og Telemark	120,000	(Sweden) Kalle Brink	CHA
9 Jul	Interspons Open	Vestland	15,000	(Norway) Eirik Tage Johansen	NGL
6 Aug	Norwegian National Golf Championship	Rogaland	15,000	(Norway) Andrè Thorsen (1)	
20 Aug	Sony Ericsson Open	Oslo	15,000	(Norway) Christian Aronsen	NGL
3 Sep	Hydro-Texaco Open	Viken	15,000	(Norway) Knut Børsheim (a)	NGL

=== Order of Merit ===
The Order of Merit was based on prize money won during the season, calculated using a points-based system.

Position	Player	Points
1	(Norway) Eirik Tage Johansen	21,788
2	(Norway) Christian Aronsen	20,941
3	(Norway) Knut Børsheim (a)	17,525
4	(Sweden) Kalle Brink	16,000
5	(Norway) Martin Dahl	15,044

== 2005 season ==
=== Schedule ===
The following table lists official events during the 2005 season.

Date	Tournament	Location	Purse (€)	Winner (Note: The number in brackets after each winner's name is the number of Norwegian Golf Tour events they had won up to and including that tournament. As most Norwegian Golf Tour events were incorporated into the Nordic Golf League schedules, details of these wins are displayed there instead.)	Main tour (Note: NGL − Nordic Golf League.)
8 May	DnB Open	Vestland	15,000	(Sweden) Fredrick Månsson	NGL
28 May	Fujitsu-Siemens Open	Viken	15,000	(Norway) Lars Brovold	NGL
18 Jun	Gant Open	Viken	15,000	(Finland) Erik Stenman	NGL
10 Jul	Vestfold Open	Vestfold og Telemark	12,000	(Norway) Henrik Bjørnstad	NGL
7 Aug	Norwegian National Golf Championship	Innlandet	12,000	(Norway) Øyvind Rojahn (1)	
11 Aug	Telehuset Open	Oslo	15,000	(Norway) Ross Robertson	NGL
3 Sep	Hydro-Texaco Open	Viken	15,000	(Sweden) Christian Nilsson	NGL

=== Order of Merit ===
The Order of Merit was based on prize money won during the season, calculated using a points-based system.

Position	Player	Points
1	(Norway) Øyvind Rojahn	16,990
2	(Norway) Morten Hagen	16,988
3	(Sweden) Christian Nilsson	16,913
4	(Norway) Martin Dahl	15,187
5	(Norway) Christian Aronsen	14,975

== 2004 season ==
=== Schedule ===
The following table lists official events during the 2004 season.

Date	Tournament	Location	Purse (€)	Winner	Main tour
30 May	Fujitsu Siemens Open	Viken	15,000	(Norway) Morten Hagen	NGL
11 Jun	Gant Open	Vestfold og Telemark	15,000	(Norway) Thomas Hansen	NGL
27 Jun	Hydro-Texaco Open	Viken	15,000	(Norway) Eirik Tage Johansen	NGL
25 Jul	Birkebeiner Open	Innlandet	15,000	(Sweden) David Jonsson	NGL
8 Aug	Norwegian National Golf Championship	Oslo	15,000	(Norway) Eirik Tage Johansen (a) (1)	
22 Aug	Norwegian Challenge	Vestfold	105,000	(Republic of Ireland) Stephen Browne	CHA
5 Sep	P4 Tour Open	Viken	15,000	(Norway) Thomas Nielsen	NGL

=== Order of Merit ===
The Order of Merit was based on prize money won during the season, calculated using a points-based system.

Position	Player	Points
1	(Norway) Thomas Hansen	22,020
2	(Norway) Eirik Tage Johansen (a)	20,000
3	(Norway) Morten Hagen	19,525
4	(Norway) Øyvind Rojahn	14,993
5	(Sweden) Paul Nilbrink	13,925

== Order of Merit winners ==
Year	Winner	Points
2006	(Norway) Eirik Tage Johansen	21,788
2005	(Norway) Øyvind Rojahn	16,990
2004	(Norway) Thomas Hansen	22,020

== See also ==
- Danish Golf Tour
- Finnish Tour
- Nordic Golf League
- Swedish Golf Tour
