= Joakim Bäckström =

Swedish professional golfer (born 1978)

Personal information
- Nationality: Sweden
- Born: 16 March 1978 (age 48) Umeå, Sweden
- Height: 1.94 m (6 ft 4 in)
- Weight: 87 kg (192 lb; 13.7 st)

Career
- Sport: Golf
- Turned professional: 1999
- Former tours: European Tour; Nordic Golf League; Swedish Golf Tour
- Professional wins: 12

Number of wins by tour
- European Tour: 1
- Challenge Tour: 1
- Other: 10

Joakim Bäckström (born 16 March 1978) is a Swedish professional golfer and former European Tour player. He won the 2005 Aa St Omer Open in France.

== Early life and amateur career ==
Bäckström was born in Umeå and was a member of the Swedish National Team. He was runner-up with the team and individually at the 1995 Junior Golf World Cup in Japan, behind American Joel Kribel. He helped Sweden to a 4th place at the 1997 European Amateur Team Championship at Portmarnock Golf Club in Ireland, alongside Peter Hanson and Henrik Stenson.

== Professional career ==
In 1999, Bäckström turned professional.

Having failed to win a place on the European Tour in 2000, Bäckström spent his early career in Sweden on the Nordic Golf League, where he won the 2001 Gula Sidorna Grand Opening and the 2002 Sunbyholm Open. He also picked up five wins in Denmark during 2003 and 2004.

Bäckström finally joined the European Tour in 2005 after coming through the 2004 qualifying school final stage, and won the Aa St Omer Open during his rookie season. However he has struggled to establish himself after that, never finishing inside the top 100 on the Order of Merit, and lost his tour card at the end of 2008.

== Personal life ==
Bäckström married former Ladies European Tour player Antonella Cvitan. They won the Swedish Husband-Wife Championship in 2014 and 2019.

== Professional wins (12) ==
=== European Tour wins (1) ===
No.	Date	Tournament	Winning score	Margin of victory	Runner-up
1	19 Jun 2005	Aa St Omer Open^{1}	−4 (72-70-68-70=280)	Playoff	(England) Paul Dwyer

^{1}Dual-ranking event with the Challenge Tour

European Tour playoff record (1–0)

No.	Year	Tournament	Opponent	Result
1	2005	Aa St Omer Open	(England) Paul Dwyer	Won with par on first extra hole

=== Nordic Golf League wins (5) ===
No.	Date	Tournament	Winning score	Margin of victory	Runner(s)-up
1	15 Jul 2001	Sundbyholm Open	−1 (75-69-71=215)	Playoff	(Sweden) Jimmy Kawalec
2	28 Sep 2003	Marlboro Classic Masters	−2 (70-71-73=214)	Playoff	(Norway) Øyvind Rojahn, (Denmark) Arild Townhill
3	3 Aug 2004	Hjarbæk Open	−2 (72-72-70=214)	Playoff	(Sweden) Linus Pettersson (a)
4	2 Oct 2010	Helsingborg Golf Open	+1 (72-74-71=217)	2 strokes	(Sweden) Johan Bjerhag
5	20 May 2011	Danfoss Masters	−6 (70-69-71=210)	1 stroke	(Denmark) Joachim B. Hansen, (Denmark) Lasse Sonne Nielsen

=== Swedish Golf Tour wins (1) ===
No.	Date	Tournament	Winning score	Margin of victory	Runner-up
1	15 May 2000	Gula Sidorna Grand Opening	−3 (68-71=139)	2 strokes	(Sweden) Johan Bjerhag

=== Other wins (5) ===
- 2004 Krone Golf Tour Open, Samsø Linien Pro-am, A Hereford Beefstouw Open
- 2014 Swedish Husband-Wife Championship (with Antonella Cvitan)
- 2019 Swedish Husband-Wife Championship (with Antonella Cvitan)

== Team appearances ==
Amateur

- Junior Golf World Cup (representing Sweden): 1995
- Jacques Léglise Trophy (representing the Continent of Europe): 1995, 1996 (winners)
- European Amateur Team Championship (representing Sweden): 1997

== See also ==
- 2007 European Tour Qualifying School graduates
