= 2003 Nordic Golf League =

Golf tour season

2003 Nordic Golf League season
- Duration: 24 April 2003 – 28 September 2003
- Number of official events: 27
- Most wins: (Sweden) Pelle Edberg (3)
- Order of Merit: (Norway) Øyvind Rojahn

The 2003 Nordic Golf League was the fifth season of the Nordic Golf League, a third-tier tour recognised by the European Tour.

== Schedule ==
The following table lists official events during the 2003 season.

Date	Tournament	Host country	Purse	Winner (Note: The number in brackets after each winner's name is the number of Nordic Golf League events they had won up to and including that tournament. It is rare for someone to accumulate many wins on the Nordic Golf League as success at this level usually leads to promotion to the Challenge Tour.)
26 Apr	Viasat Sport Open	Denmark	€15,000	(Sweden) Fredrik Söderström (1)
30 Apr	Wilson Open	Denmark	€15,000	(Denmark) Allan Høgh Madsen (1)
13 May	Telia Grand Opening	Sweden	SKr 100,000	(Sweden) Pelle Edberg (1)
18 May	Gambro Open	Sweden	SKr 200,000	(Sweden) Johan Möller (a) (1)
25 May	Finnish Golf Tour Opening	Finland	€9,000	(Finland) Jarkko Soikkeli (1)
25 May	Kinnaborg Open	Sweden	SKr 200,000	(Sweden) Jimmy Kawalec (1)
8 Jun	Rönnebäck Open	Sweden	€15,000	(Sweden) Pelle Edberg (2)
15 Jun	Affecto Open	Finland	€9,000	(Finland) Keijo Jaakola (a) (1)
15 Jun	Husqvarna Open	Sweden	SKr 300,000	(Sweden) Hampus von Post (3)
19 Jun	Expobank Russian Cup	Russia	€30,000	(Finland) Janne Martikainen (1)
27 Jun	Starkki Challenge	Finland	€9,000	(Finland) Jarkko Soikkeli (2)
28 Jun	SM Match	Sweden	SKr 200,000	(Sweden) Andreaz Lindberg (1)
29 Jun	Telia Open	Sweden	€47,000	(Denmark) Christian Bindslev (1)
4 Jul	St Ibb Open	Sweden	SKr 230,000	(Sweden) Åke Nilsson (1)
6 Jul	Clubhouse Open	Denmark	€15,000	(Denmark) Anders Bøgebjerg (1)
11 Jul	Hjarbæk Open	Denmark	€15,000	(Denmark) Jesper Bentsen (1)
27 Jul	Nordic Open Qualifying	Denmark	€25,000	(Sweden) Jakob Berlin (1)
27 Jul	Birkebeiner Open	Norway	€8,000	(Scotland) Paul Blaikie (1)
14 Aug	Sundbyholm Open	Sweden	SKr 200,000	(Sweden) Pelle Edberg (3)
17 Aug	Sony Cybershot Open	Finland	€9,000	(Finland) Juha-Pekka Peltomäki (1)
22 Aug	Swedish International	Sweden	SKr 200,000	(Finland) Ari Savolainen (1)
24 Aug	Griffin Open	Denmark	€34,000	(Sweden) Jonas Torines (1)
31 Aug	NL-Norge 2	Norway	€20,000	(Sweden) Andreas Ljunggren (3)
6 Sep	Västerås Open	Sweden	SKr 250,000	(Sweden) Leif Westerberg (1)
7 Sep	Holiday Club Open	Finland	€9,000	(Finland) Janne Martikainen (2)
11 Sep	Falster Open	Denmark	€15,000	(Sweden) Andreas Ljunggren (4)
28 Sep	Marlboro Classic Masters	Denmark	€15,000	(Sweden) Joakim Bäckström (2)

== Order of Merit ==
The Order of Merit was based on tournament results during the season, calculated using a points-based system. The top four players on the Order of Merit (not otherwise exempt) earned status to play on the 2004 Challenge Tour.

Position	Player	Points	Status earned
1	(Norway) Øyvind Rojahn	1,820	Promoted to Challenge Tour
2	(Sweden) Fredrik Henge	1,782	Finished in Top 80 of Challenge Tour Rankings
3	(Sweden) Leif Westerberg	1,613	Finished in Top 80 of Challenge Tour Rankings
4	(Sweden) Pelle Edberg	1,577	Promoted to Challenge Tour
5	(Sweden) Andreas Ljunggren	1,358	Qualified for Challenge Tour (made cut in Q School)
6	(Sweden) Christian Nilsson	1,336	Promoted to Challenge Tour
7	(Sweden) Jonas Torines	1,284	Promoted to Challenge Tour
8	(Sweden) Tony Edlund	1,209	Finished in Top 80 of Challenge Tour Rankings
9	(Sweden) Johan Bjerhag	986	
10	(Finland) Janne Martikainen	837	

== See also ==
- 2003 Danish Golf Tour
- 2003 Finnish Tour
- 2003 Swedish Golf Tour
