= Telia Grand Opening =

Telia Tour Opening
Tournament information
- Location: Varberg, Sweden
- Established: 1999
- Course: Varbergs Golfklubb
- Par: 72
- Tours: Nordic Golf League; Swedish Golf Tour
- Format: Stroke play
- Prize fund: kr 110,000
- Month played: May
- Final year: 2005

Tournament record score
- Aggregate: 128 Eric Carlberg (2004)
- To par: −10 as above

Final champion
- (Sweden) Erik Algulin

Location map
- Location in Sweden

The Telia Grand Opening was a golf tournament played as the season opening event between 1999 and 2005 on the Swedish Golf Tour, at the time known as the Telia Tour.

The tournament was played in conjunction with the women's Telia Grand Opening.

== Winners ==
Year	Tour (Note: NGL − Nordic Golf League; SWE − Swedish Golf Tour.)	Winner	Score	To par	Margin of victory	Runner-up	Venue	Ref.
Telia Tour Opening
2005	NGL	(Sweden) Erik Algulin	143	−1	1 stroke	(Sweden) Per G. Nyman	Varberg	
Telia Grand Opening
2004	NGL	(Sweden) Eric Carlberg	128	−10	2 strokes	(Sweden) Linus Pettersson	Hovås	
2003	NGL	(Sweden) Pelle Edberg	138	−2	Playoff	(Sweden) Christian Nilsson	Hovås	
2002	NGL	(Sweden) Johan Edfors	135	−5	4 strokes	(Sweden) Hampus von Post	Hovås	
2001	SWE	(Sweden) Jonas Runnquist	135	−7	3 strokes	(Sweden) Patrik Gottfridson	Fågelbro	
Gula Sidorna Grand Opening
2000	SWE	(Sweden) Joakim Bäckström	139	−3	2 strokes	(Sweden) Johan Bjerhag	Fågelbro	
1999	SWE	(Sweden) Peter Hanson	142	E	2 strokes	(Sweden) Niclas Fasth	Fågelbro	
