= Peter Hanson =

Swedish professional golfer

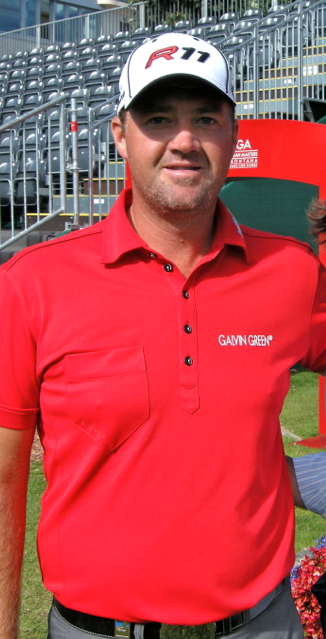

Personal information
- Full name: Peter Daniel Hanson
- Nationality: Sweden
- Born: 4 October 1977 (age 49) Svedala, Sweden
- Height: 1.90 m (6 ft 3 in)
- Weight: 85 kg (187 lb; 13.4 st)
- Spouse: Susanna Hanson (m. 2005)
- Children: 2

Career
- Sport: Golf
- Turned professional: 1998
- Former tours: PGA Tour; European Tour; Challenge Tour; Nordic Golf League; Swedish Golf Tour
- Professional wins: 12
- Highest ranking: 17 (28 October 2012)

Number of wins by tour
- European Tour: 6
- Challenge Tour: 1
- Other: 5

Best results in major championships
- Masters Tournament: T3: 2012
- PGA Championship: T7: 2012
- U.S. Open: T7: 2011
- The Open Championship: T23: 2012

Achievements and awards
- Swedish Golfer of the Year: 2012

Peter Daniel Hanson (born 4 October 1977) is a Swedish former professional golfer who played on the European Tour and the PGA Tour.

== Early life ==
Hanson was born in Svedala, in Skåne county in the south of Sweden. He was first introduced to the game by neighbors and started playing at Bokskogen Golf Club, where he was coached by club professional Jan Larsson.

== Amateur career ==
Hanson was a member of the Swedish team at age 19, finishing fourth, at the 1997 European Amateur Team Championship at Portmarnock Golf Club, Ireland.

As an amateur, he won three times on the professional Swedish Golf Tour in 1997 and 1998. In 1998, he also won the Brabazon Trophy at Formby Golf Club.

After representing Sweden at the 1998 Eisenhower Trophy in Santiago, Chile, Hanson turned professional.

== Professional career ==
Hanson played on the Swedish Golf Tour and the Challenge Tour in 1999 and 2000. In 2001, he played 25 tournaments on the European Tour and at the same time finished 12th on the 2001 Challenge Tour final Order of Merit, qualifying for the 2002 European Tour season.

His first win abroad as a professional came at the 2001 Gunther Hamburg Classics on the Challenge Tour, with a 23-under-par winning score of 265 at Treudelberg Golf Club, Germany.

His first European Tour win was the 2005 Open de España at San Roque Club, Sotogrande, Spain. He has since won four more titles on the European Tour. He consistently finished in the top-20 of the European Tour Order of Merit from 2007 to 2012. His best position on the Order of Merit occurred in 2012 when he placed 4th.

On 17 August 2008, Hanson became the third Swede to win a European Tour event on home soil, when he captured the SAS Masters at Arlandastad, for the first Swedish win in the tournament for ten years.

On 27 March 2012, Hanson accepted an invitation to join the PGA Tour for the remainder of 2012 with Special Temporary Membership status.

Hanson recorded his best finish at a major championship in April 2012, at the Masters Tournament at Augusta National Golf Club. After scoring a seven-under-par round of 65 in the third round, Hanson was the sole 54-hole leader at 9-under-par with a one stroke advantage heading into the final round. His final round, playing in the last group with Phil Mickelson, started badly with two bogeys in the opening three holes and he never recovered. On the par-3 12th hole, Hanson shanked his tee shot short of Rae's Creek, but came back strongly. He chipped to two feet to birdie the 15th, played his tee shot to four feet at the 16th and holed a 15-foot birdie putt at the last for a one-over-par round of 73. Hanson finished in a tie for third, two strokes behind tied leaders Bubba Watson and Louis Oosthuizen, who played off for the title, won by Watson.

On 9 September 2012, Hanson won for the fifth time on the European Tour, taking victory at the KLM Open in The Netherlands. He began the final round a shot outside of the lead and it had looked like his chances were over after a wayward tee shot on 16 left him trouble, but he managed to escape with a par to trail Pablo Larrazábal by a single stroke. Then, after Larrazábal bogeyed the 16th, Hanson prevailed by two strokes courtesy of a long-range eagle putt on the par-five 18th. The win was even more remarkable because Hanson almost withdrew from the event after his one-year-old son Tim was taken to hospital prior to the event starting.

Making his second Ryder Cup appearance in 2012, Hanson played on the victorious European team against the United States at Medinah Country Club outside Chicago, Illinois, in September. The European 14½–13½ triumph was by European media named the "Miracle at Medinah" and regarded as one of the best sporting comebacks of all time, since the U.S. team at one stage on Saturday led by 10–4. However, Hanson played only two matches and lost both. In the Sunday singles, he met Jason Dufner in the 9th match and lost, 2 down.

The month after, on 28 October 2012, Hanson received the biggest prize check of his career, €888,560, when he won the BMW Masters at Lake Malaren Golf Club, Shanghai, China, out-dueling world number one Rory McIlroy, when they played together in the last group of the last round. With the win, Hanson reached a career best 17th on the Official World Golf Ranking.

Hanson moved to Lake Nona, Orlando, Florida, to play on the PGA Tour in 2013, but after being forced to withdraw before the last round of the 2013 Northern Trust Open in March, due to pain in his back and immediately being driven to a hospital in Los Angeles, the rest of his career has been continuously interrupted by a disc herniation injury. In 2017, he moved back to Sweden with his wife and two children. He played the 2017 European Tour with a medical exemption and through 2020 still held 36th position on the European Tour career money list.

In late 2021, Hanson announced that he would be retiring from professional golf. He made his last appearance on tour at the 2022 Volvo Car Scandinavian Mixed.

== Awards, honors ==
In 2005, he received Elit Sign number 132 by the Swedish Golf Federation on the basis of national team appearances and national championship performances.

In 2011, he was awarded honorary member of the PGA of Sweden.

In 2022, he was awarded the Merit Sign in Gold by the PGA of Sweden, as its 47th recipient.

== Amateur wins ==
- 1998 Brabazon Trophy, Emirates Amateur Open Championship

== Professional wins (12) ==
=== European Tour wins (6) ===
No.	Date	Tournament	Winning score	Margin of victory	Runner(s)-up
1	17 Apr 2005	Jazztel Open de España en Andalucía	−8 (70-68-71-71=280)	Playoff	(Sweden) Peter Gustafsson
2	17 Aug 2008	SAS Masters	−9 (66-66-68-71=271)	1 stroke	(England) Nick Dougherty, (Sweden) Pelle Edberg
3	16 May 2010	Iberdrola Open Cala Millor Mallorca	−6 (72-69-67-66=274)	Playoff	(Spain) Alejandro Cañizares
4	22 Aug 2010	Czech Open	−10 (67-70-67-74=278)	Playoff	(England) Gary Boyd, (Republic of Ireland) Peter Lawrie
5	9 Sep 2012	KLM Open	−14 (66-66-67-67=266)	2 strokes	(Spain) Pablo Larrazábal, (Scotland) Richie Ramsay
6	28 Oct 2012	BMW Masters	−21 (66-64-70-67=267)	1 stroke	(Northern Ireland) Rory McIlroy

European Tour playoff record (3–0)

No.	Year	Tournament	Opponent(s)	Result
1	2005	Jazztel Open de España en Andalucía	(Sweden) Peter Gustafsson	Won with par on first extra hole
2	2010	Iberdrola Open Cala Millor Mallorca	(Spain) Alejandro Cañizares	Won with par on first extra hole
3	2010	Czech Open	(England) Gary Boyd, (Republic of Ireland) Peter Lawrie	Won with birdie on second extra hole

=== Challenge Tour wins (1) ===
No.	Date	Tournament	Winning score	Margin of victory	Runner-up
1	22 Jul 2001	Günther Hamburg Classic	−23 (66-69-64-66=265)	3 strokes	(Netherlands) Robert-Jan Derksen

=== Nordic Golf League wins (1) ===
No.	Date	Tournament	Winning score	Margin of victory	Runner-up
1	3 Sep 2000	Russian Cup	−9 (67-68=135)	7 strokes	(Sweden) Fredrick Månsson

=== Swedish Golf Tour wins (4) ===
No.	Date	Tournament	Winning score	Margin of victory	Runner(s)-up
1	10 Aug 1997	Västerås Open (as an amateur)	−13 (68-64-62=194)	6 strokes	(Sweden) Johan Forsman, (Sweden) Joakim Nilsson
2	28 Jun 1998	Husqvarna Open (as an amateur)	−12 (69-66-63=198)	2 strokes	(Norway) Morten Haerås
3	9 Aug 1998	Västerås Open (2) (as an amateur)	−7 (71-73-65=209)	1 stroke	(Sweden) Andreas Ljunggren
4	10 May 1999	Gula Sidorna Grand Opening	E (69-73=142)	2 strokes	(Sweden) Niclas Fasth

== Results in major championships ==
Tournament	2005	2006	2007	2008	2009	2010	2011	2012	2013	2014	2015	2016
Masters Tournament							CUT	T3	T50	CUT		
U.S. Open	CUT		T30		T18	T16	T7	CUT	CUT			DQ
The Open Championship	T34		T69	T58	T24	T37	CUT	T23	WD			
PGA Championship	T59		T23	T52	CUT	T58	T64	T7	T33			

Top 10
Did not play

CUT = missed the half-way cut
DQ = disqualified
WD = withdrew
"T" = tied

=== Summary ===
Tournament	Wins	2nd	3rd	Top-5	Top-10	Top-25	Events	Cuts made
Masters Tournament	0	0	1	1	1	1	4	2
U.S. Open	0	0	0	0	1	3	8	4
The Open Championship	0	0	0	0	0	2	8	6
PGA Championship	0	0	0	0	1	2	8	7
Totals	0	0	1	1	3	8	28	19

- Most consecutive cuts made – 9 (2005 Open Championship – 2009 Open Championship)
- Longest streak of top-10s – 1 (three times)

== Results in The Players Championship ==
Tournament	2011	2012	2013
The Players Championship	T19	T15	T72

"T" indicates a tie for a place

== Results in World Golf Championships ==
Tournament	2008	2009	2010	2011	2012	2013	2014
Match Play	R64	R16	R64	R64	QF	R32	R32
Championship	T61	T40	T26	T55	T4	T8	
Invitational			8	T21	T63	T33	
Champions		T31	T6	T33	T24	T21	

Top 10
Did not play

QF, R16, R32, R64 = Round in which player lost in match play
"T" = Tied
Note that the HSBC Champions did not become a WGC event until 2009.

== Team appearances ==
Amateur

- European Amateur Team Championship (representing Sweden): 1997
- European Youths' Team Championship (representing Sweden): 1998
- Eisenhower Trophy (representing Sweden): 1998
- St Andrews Trophy (representing the Continent of Europe): 1998 (winners)
- Bonallack Trophy (representing Europe): 1998 (winners)

Professional

- Seve Trophy (representing Continental Europe): 2005, 2007, 2009, 2011
- World Cup (representing Sweden): 2007, 2013
- Royal Trophy (representing Europe): 2010 (winners), 2011 (winners)
- Ryder Cup (representing Europe): 2010 (winners), 2012 (winners). His personal Ryder Cup record is 1 win and 4 losses.
