= Rikard Karlberg =

Swedish professional golfer

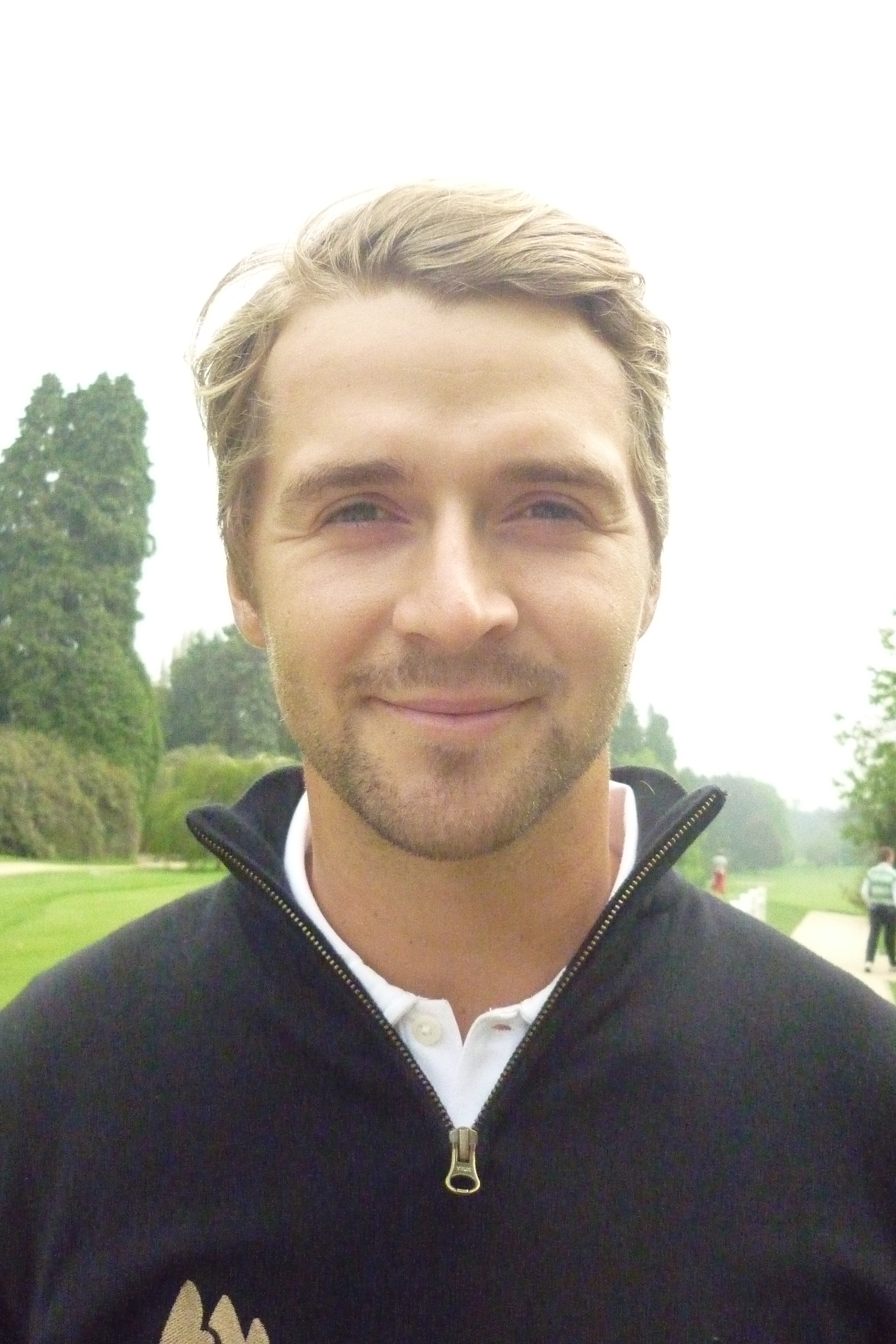

Personal information
- Full name: Rikard Karlberg
- Nationality: Sweden
- Born: 1 December 1986 (age 39) Gothenburg, Sweden
- Height: 1.80 m (5 ft 11 in)
- Weight: 73 kg (161 lb; 11.5 st)
- Spouse: Pernilla Karlberg

Career
- Sport: Golf
- Turned professional: 2006
- Current tour: Challenge Tour
- Former tours: European Tour; Asian Tour
- Professional wins: 8
- Highest ranking: 69 (19 June 2016)

Number of wins by tour
- European Tour: 1
- Asian Tour: 2
- Other: 5

Best results in major championships
- Masters Tournament: DNP
- PGA Championship: CUT: 2016
- U.S. Open: CUT: 2010, 2013
- The Open Championship: CUT: 2015, 2016, 2021

Achievements and awards
- Swedish Golf Tour Order of Merit winner: 2007
- Nordic Golf League Order of Merit winner: 2007
- Asian Tour Rookie of the Year: 2010

Rikard Karlberg (born 1 December 1986) is a Swedish professional golfer. He won the 2015 Open d'Italia on the European Tour after winning a play-off against Martin Kaymer. He has also won twice on the Asian Tour and won the 2007 Nordic Golf League Order of Merit.

== Early life and amateur career ==
Rikard Karlberg was born on 1 December 1986 in Gothenburg, Sweden. He represented Sweden at the 2003 European Boys' Team Championship in the Czech Republic and at the 2004 European Youths' Team Championship in Ireland.

== Professional career ==
He turned professional in 2006. He topped the Nordic League rankings in 2007 to earn a tour card on the Challenge Tour. His best finish on the Challenge Tour was T4 at the 2008 Reale Challenge de España.

Karlberg earned his 2010 Asian Tour card through qualifying school. He won the second Asian Tour event he played, the SAIL Open. Later in the year, he won his second Asian Tour title at the Hero Honda Indian Open.

Karlberg earned a 2015 European Tour card through qualifying school, and won the Open d'Italia during his rookie season, after holing a birdie putt on the second extra hole in a play-off against Martin Kaymer.

He finished runner-up at the 2016 BMW PGA Championship en route to a career-best 69th a month later on the Official World Golf Ranking and a season finish of 34th in the Race to Dubai.

After battling illness which forced him to step away from competitive golf, he holed a 50-foot birdie putt on the final hole of 2019 Qualifying School to earn the final European Tour card for 2020.

At the 2021 Dubai Duty Free Irish Open in early July, Karlberg finished runner-up, after holing a chip from the greenside rough on the 72nd hole. The achievement earned him €314,170 in prize money and a late spot at The 149th Open Championship two weeks later.

== Professional wins (8) ==
=== European Tour wins (1) ===
| No. | Date | Tournament | Winning score | Margin of victory | Runner-up |
|---|---|---|---|---|---|
| 1 | 20 Sep 2015 | Open d'Italia | −19 (67-67-68-67=269) | Playoff | (Germany) Martin Kaymer |

European Tour playoff record (1–0)

| No. | Year | Tournament | Opponent | Result |
|---|---|---|---|---|
| 1 | 2015 | Open d'Italia | (Germany) Martin Kaymer | Won with birdie on second extra hole |

=== Asian Tour wins (2) ===
| No. | Date | Tournament | Winning score | Margin of victory | Runner-up |
|---|---|---|---|---|---|
| 1 | 2 Apr 2010 | SAIL Open | −20 (65-69-68-66=268) | 5 strokes | (India) Shiv Kapur |
| 2 | 5 Dec 2010 | Hero Honda Indian Open | −11 (70-69-68-70=277) | 2 strokes | (South Korea) Baek Seuk-hyun |

=== Nordic Golf League wins (4) ===
| No. | Date | Tournament | Winning score | Margin of victory | Runner(s)-up |
|---|---|---|---|---|---|
| 1 | 19 Aug 2006 | PGA Landmann Open | −10 (66-72-68=206) | Playoff | (Sweden) Kalle Edberg |
| 2 | 13 May 2007 | St Ibb Open | 27 pts (9-10-8=27) | 2 points | (Sweden) Pehr Magnebrant, (Sweden) Fredrik Söderström |
| 3 | 11 Aug 2007 | PGA Landmann Open (2) | −12 (73-63-68=204) | Playoff | (Sweden) Oskar Henningsson, (Sweden) Olle Karlsson |
| 4 | 14 Oct 2007 | Unibake Masters | −21 (66-63-66=195) | 3 strokes | (Denmark) Brian Akstrup, (Sweden) Joakim Rask |

=== Other wins (1) ===
- 2009 Stenungsund Open (Swedish Golf Ranking)

== Results in major championships ==
Results not in chronological order in 2020.

| Tournament | 2010 | 2011 | 2012 | 2013 | 2014 | 2015 | 2016 | 2017 | 2018 |
|---|---|---|---|---|---|---|---|---|---|
| Masters Tournament | | | | | | | | | |
| U.S. Open | CUT | | | CUT | | | | | |
| The Open Championship | | | | | | CUT | CUT | | |
| PGA Championship | | | | | | | CUT | | |

| Tournament | 2019 | 2020 | 2021 |
|---|---|---|---|
| Masters Tournament | | | |
| PGA Championship | | | |
| U.S. Open | | | |
| The Open Championship | | NT | CUT |

Did not play

CUT = missed the half-way cut
NT = No tournament due to COVID-19 pandemic

== Results in World Golf Championships ==
| Tournament | 2016 |
|---|---|
| Championship | |
| Match Play | |
| Invitational | |
| Champions | T19 |

Did not play

"T" = Tied

== Team appearances ==
Amateur

- European Boys' Team Championship (representing Sweden): 2003
- European Youths' Team Championship (representing Sweden): 2004

== See also ==
- 2014 European Tour Qualifying School graduates
- 2019 European Tour Qualifying School graduates
