= 1998 Swedish Golf Tour =

Golf tour season

1998 Swedish Golf Tour season
- Duration: 11 June 1998 – 4 October 1998
- Number of official events: 14
- Most wins: (Sweden) Peter Hanson (2)
- Order of Merit: (Sweden) Fredrik Larsson

The 1998 Swedish Golf Tour, titled as the 1998 Telia Tour for sponsorship reasons, was the 15th season of the Swedish Golf Tour, the main professional golf tour in Sweden since it was formed in 1984, with most tournaments being incorporated into the Challenge Tour between 1989 and 1998.

== Schedule ==
The following table lists official events during the 1998 season.

Date	Tournament	Location	Purse (SKr)	Winner (Note: The number in brackets after each winner's name is the number of Swedish Golf Tour events they had won up to and including that tournament. As most Swedish Golf Tour events are incorporated into the Challenge Tour schedules, details of these wins are displayed there instead.)	Main tour (Note: CHA − Challenge Tour.)
14 Jun	NCC Open	Skåne	£40,000	(Sweden) Johan Ryström	CHA
20 Jun	Onsöy Open	Norway	200,000	(Norway) Morten Hagen (1)	
28 Jun	Husqvarna Open	Småland	210,000	(Sweden) Peter Hanson (a) (2)	
5 Jul	GE Capital Bank Open	Skåne	200,000	(Sweden) Adam Mednick (1)	
12 Jul	Volvo Finnish Open	Finland	£40,000	(France) Christian Cévaër	CHA
9 Aug	Västerås Open	Västmanland	150,000	(Sweden) Peter Hanson (a) (3)	
23 Aug	Saab Open	Södermanland	300,000	(Sweden) Hans Edberg (1)	
30 Aug	Navision Open Golf Championship	Denmark	£40,000	(Denmark) Søren Hansen	CHA
6 Sep	Öhrlings Swedish Matchplay	Halland	£45,000	(United States) Kevin Carissimi	CHA
6 Sep	Audi Open	Norway	200,000	(Sweden) Tomas Körberg (a) (1)	
13 Sep	Tor Line Open	Halland	350,000	(Sweden) Johan Bjerhag (1)	
20 Sep	Swedish PGA Championship	Värmland	200,000	(Sweden) Ulrik Gustafsson (1)	
27 Sep	AP Parts Motoman Open	Småland	150,000	(Sweden) Fredrik Widmark (1)	
4 Oct	Telia Grand Prix	Skåne	£85,000	(Sweden) Mats Lanner	CHA

== Order of Merit ==
The Order of Merit was based on tournament results during the season, calculated using a points-based system.

Position	Player	Points
1	(Sweden) Fredrik Larsson	968
2	(Sweden) Adam Mednick	937
3	(Sweden) Ulrik Gustafsson	901
4	(Sweden) Fredrik Widmark	900
5	(Sweden) Peter Hanson (a)	881

== See also ==
- 1998 Swedish Golf Tour (women)
