= 2000 Nordic Golf League =

Golf tour season

2000 Nordic Golf League season
- Duration: 29 April 2000 – 24 September 2000
- Number of official events: 24
- Most wins: (Norway) Morten Orveland (3)
- Order of Merit: (Norway) Morten Orveland

The 2000 Nordic Golf League was the second season of the Nordic Golf League, a third-tier tour recognised by the European Tour.

== Schedule ==
The following table lists official events during the 2000 season.

Date	Tournament	Host country	Purse	Winner (Note: The number in brackets after each winner's name is the number of Nordic Golf League events they had won up to and including that tournament. It is rare for someone to accumulate many wins on the Nordic Golf League as success at this level usually leads to promotion to the Challenge Tour.)
1 May	P4 Open	Norway	NKr 100,000	(Norway) Morten Orveland (1)
14 May	Vår Bank og Forsikring Cup	Norway	NKr 100,000	(Sweden) Andreas Ljunggren (1)
28 May	Kinnaborg Open	Sweden	SKr 150,000	(Sweden) Joakim Rask (1)
4 Jun	St Ibb Open	Sweden	SKr 225,000	(Sweden) Kristofer Svensson (1)
11 Jun	Canon Masters	Finland	FIM 60,000	(Finland) Mikko Manerus (1)
12 Jun	Arendal Norge	Norway	NKr 100,000	(Norway) Øyvind Rojahn (2)
17 Jun	Sonera-Kiitolinja Open	Finland	FIM 70,000	(Finland) Mikael Piltz (5)
17 Jun	Norge PGA Larvik	Norway	NKr 100,000	(Denmark) Martin D. Jakobsen (1)
18 Jun	Husqvarna Open	Sweden	SKr 300,000	(Sweden) Kristofer Svensson (2)
25 Jun	Hydro-Texaco Open	Norway	NKr 100,000	(Sweden) Patric Linden (1)
1 Jul	Wilson Rebild Open	Denmark	DKr 125,000	(Sweden) Andreas Ljunggren (2)
1 Jul	golf.se Invitational	Sweden	SKr 180,000	(Sweden) Per Larsson (2)
29 Jul	Hook Masters	Sweden	SKr 200,000	(Sweden) Jesper Björklund (1)
29 Jul	Birkebeiner Open	Norway	NKr 100,000	(Norway) Morten Orveland (2)
12 Aug	Skandia PGA Open	Sweden	SKr 400,000	(Norway) Morten Orveland (3)
17 Aug	Sundsvall Open	Sweden	SKr 150,000	(Sweden) Fredrick Månsson (1)
26 Aug	Västerås Open	Sweden	SKr 250,000	(Sweden) Hampus von Post (1)
27 Aug	Griffin Open	Denmark	DKr 150,000	(Denmark) Jesper Kjærbye (1)
3 Sep	Russian Cup	Russia	US$20,000	(Sweden) Peter Hanson (1)
3 Sep	SM Match	Sweden	SKr 300,000	(Sweden) Björn Pettersson (2)
3 Sep	PGA Mesterskapet	Norway	NKr 100,000	(Norway) Don Bell (1)
10 Sep	DFDS Tor Line Open	Sweden	SKr 400,000	(Sweden) Linus Pettersson (1)
17 Sep	Audi Open	Norway	NKr 100,000	(Norway) Martin Vikström (1)
24 Sep	Soumen PGA	Finland	FIM 70,000	(Finland) Pasi Purhonen (1)

== Order of Merit ==
The Order of Merit was based on tournament results during the season, calculated using a points-based system.

Position	Player	Points
1	(Norway) Morten Orveland	2,147
2	(Sweden) Per Larsson	1,700
3	(Sweden) Andreas Ljunggren	1,623
4	(Sweden) Peter Hanson	1,354
5	(Sweden) Hampus von Post	1,288

== See also ==
- 2000 Swedish Golf Tour
