= Øyvind Rojahn =

Norwegian professional golfer

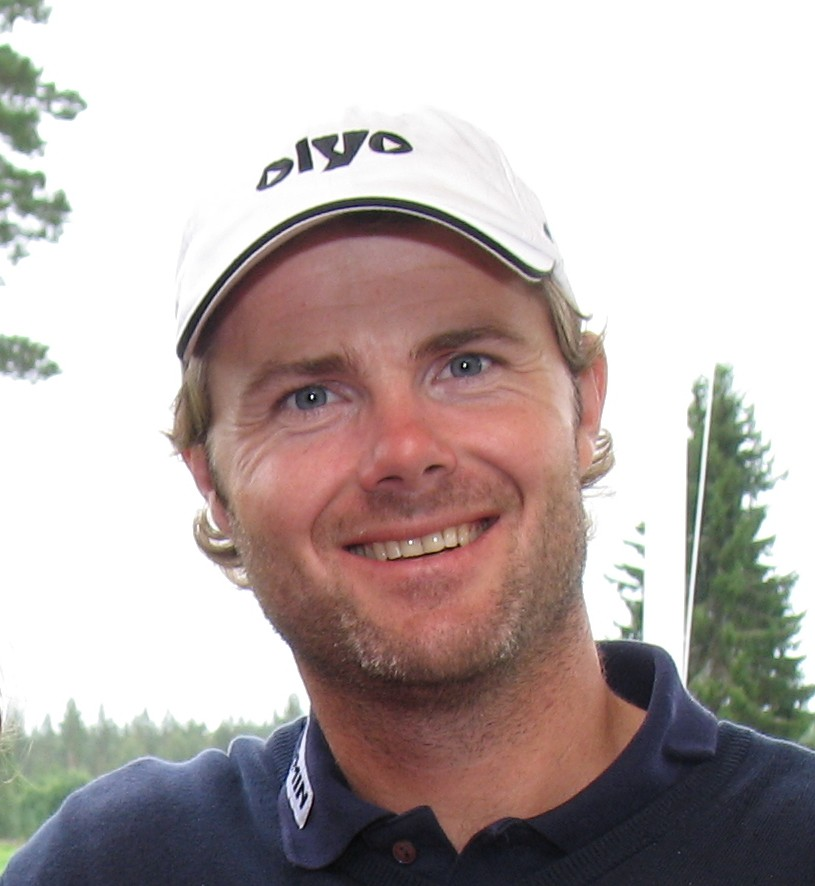

Personal information
- Nationality: Norway
- Born: 8 November 1971 (age 54) Sarpsborg, Norway
- Height: 185 cm (6 ft 1 in)

Career
- Sport: Golf
- College: New Mexico Military Institute
- Turned professional: 1993
- Former tours: European Tour; Challenge Tour; Nordic Golf League
- Professional wins: 5

Achievements and awards
- Nordic Golf League Order of Merit winner: 2003
- Danish Golf Tour Order of Merit winner: 2003
- Norwegian Golf Tour Order of Merit winner: 2005

Øyvind Rojahn (born 8 November 1971) is a Norwegian professional golfer. He was national champion twice and played on the European Tour, where his best finish was runner-up at the 1995 Air France Cannes Open.

== Amateur career ==
Rojahn hails from Sarpsborg, south east of Oslo, and was introduced to golf at the age of six by his father, who was chairman of Borregaard Golf Club. Rojahn became a scratch player by 14, the same year he won the Trophy Topolino in Sanremo, Italy. He also won the Doug Sanders European Junior Championship.

He joined the National Team and played for Norway three times in the European Amateur Team Championship with a best finish of 6th in 1989, and three times in the Eisenhower Trophy with a best finish of 8th in 1992 in Vancouver, Canada.

In 1991, Rojahn won the Norwegian National Golf Championship and received the Kongepokal. He spent 18 months on a golf scholarship at the New Mexico Military Institute in Roswell, New Mexico.

== Professional career ==
Rojahn turned professional in 1993, and played on the Challenge Tour in 1994, where he finished fifth at the Tunisian Challenge and Tessali Open in Italy, to finish the season 62nd in the rankings.

In 1995, after finishing third at the European Tour Qualifying School, he played on the European Tour where he recorded his career best finish of second at the Air France Cannes Open, two strokes behind André Bossert of Switzerland. He finished 91st in the season rankings to retain his card. After the 1996 season, he was relegated to the Challenge Tour where he spent three seasons, before joining the nascent Nordic Golf League in 2000.

Rojahn represented Norway at the 1998 World Cup of Golf in New Zealand with Per Haugsrud, where they tied for 23rd alongside South Korea.

Rojahn won several Nordic titles, including the 2004 Nordic Golf League tour championship in Denmark. He also won the 2003 Nordic Golf League Order of Merit to earn promotion to the Challenge Tour, and spent two season on the tour. In 2005, he won his second Norwegian National Golf Championship, and the Norwegian Golf Tour Order of Merit.

He retired from tour after the 2005 season, and has since been working for the Norwegian Golf Federation.

== Professional wins (5) ==
=== Nordic Golf League wins (3) ===
No.	Date	Tournament	Winning score	Margin of victory	Runner-up
1	12 Sep 1999	Siemens Open	−2 (72-71-71=214)	5 strokes	(Norway) Morten Hagen
2	12 Jun 2000	Arendal Norge	−3 (78-70-65=213)	1 stroke	(Norway) Morten Orveland
3	24 Sep 2004	Nordic League Final	−11 (70-67-68=205)	1 stroke	(Finland) Thomas Sundström

=== Norwegian Golf Tour wins (1) ===
No.	Date	Tournament	Winning score	Margin of victory	Runner-up
1	7 Aug 2005	Norwegian National Golf Championship	−8 (68-74-70-68=280)	4 strokes	(Norway) Paul Nilbrink

=== Other wins (1) ===
- 1991 Norwegian National Golf Championship (as an amateur)

== Team appearances ==
Amateur

- Eisenhower Trophy (representing Norway): 1988, 1990, 1992
- European Amateur Team Championship (representing Norway): 1989, 1991, 1993
- European Youths' Team Championship (representing Norway): 1992
- Jacques Léglise Trophy (representing Continental Europe): 1989

Professional

- World Cup of Golf (representing Norway): 1998
