= Åke Nilsson (golfer) =

Swedish professional golfer

Personal information
- Nationality: Sweden
- Born: 22 May 1982 (age 44) Kristianstad, Sweden
- Height: 185 cm (6 ft 1 in)

Career
- Sport: Golf
- Turned professional: 2002
- Former tours: European Tour; Challenge Tour; Nordic Golf League
- Professional wins: 13

Achievements and awards
- PGA of Sweden Future Fund Award: 2009

Åke Nilsson (born 22 May 1982) is a Swedish professional golfer and former European Tour player. As of 2022, he topped the list of most wins on the Nordic Golf League, with 8 victories.

== Early life ==
Nilsson was born in Kristianstad and has represented Kristianstad Golf Club. He chose not to follow his two older brothers to America on a golf scholarship, instead staying at home and turning professional in 2002, aged 20.

== Professional career ==
He joined the Nordic Golf League in 2002 and the next year won his first tournament, the St Ibb Open, a tournament using a modified Stableford scoring format. In 2008, he won his fourth NGL tournament, the SM Match, and finished second in the rankings to earn promotion to the Challenge Tour, after being mentored by former European Tour player Fredrik Widmark.

In 2009, Nilsson joined the European Tour after finishing tied ninth at the 2008 European Tour Qualifying School, alongside Bernd Wiesberger. In December 2008, he finished tied 14th at the South African Open Championship, with his brother Per on the bag. In 2009, he was tied 17th at the Italian Open, and finished tied 3rd at the Saint-Omer Open in France.

In 2010, he again played well at the Saint-Omer Open, finishing tied 8th. Also in 2010, his wife fell ill and succumbed to cancer, adversely affecting his game. He sat out most of the 2011 season and his game never fully recovered.

After a hiatus, Nilsson again set his sights on Europe. He won two tournaments on the 2017 Nordic Golf League and finished 4th in the rankings, to earn promotion to the Challenge Tour. His best finish on the 2018 Challenge Tour was a tie for 7th place at the Made in Denmark Challenge.

In 2019, he won his 8th Nordic Golf League tournament, the Gamle Fredrikstad Open in Norway.

== Professional wins (13) ==
=== Nordic Golf League wins (8) ===
No.	Date	Tournament	Winning score	Margin of victory	Runner(s)-up
1	4 Jul 2003	St Ibb Open			(Sweden) Johan Annerfelt, (Sweden) Christian Nilsson
2	28 Jul 2005	Logida Open	−15 (69-63-69=201)	3 strokes	(Sweden) Lars Johansson, (Finland) Erik Stenman (Sweden) Peter Viktor
3	15 Jul 2006	Salem Open	−11 (66-67-69=202)	5 strokes	(Sweden) Björn Pettersson
4	22 Aug 2008	SM Match	3 and 2		(Norway) Christian Aronsen
5	17 Mar 2015	PGA Catalunya Resort Championship	−4 (71-68-70=209)	Playoff	(Denmark) Martin Ovesen
6	12 May 2017	Kellers Park Masters	42 pts (13-21-8=42)	2 points	(Iceland) Axel Bóasson
7	4 Aug 2017	Made in Denmark Qualifier	−8 (67-69=136)	Playoff	(Norway) Martin Ulseth
8	20 Jun 2019	Gamle Fredrikstad Open	−14 (68-67-67=202)	2 strokes	(Sweden) Adam Eineving

=== Other wins (5) ===
- 2008 Lydinge Open
- 2012 Skepparslöv Open
- 2016 Tomelilla Open, Arboga open
- 2019 Skepparlöv Open

== See also ==
- 2008 European Tour Qualifying School graduates
