= 2005 Nordic Golf League =

Golf tour season

2005 Nordic Golf League season
- Duration: 26 April 2005 – 9 October 2005
- Number of official events: 36
- Most wins: (Finland) Panu Kylliäinen (3)
- Order of Merit: (Norway) Morten Hagen

The 2005 Nordic Golf League was the seventh season of the Nordic Golf League, a third-tier tour recognised by the European Tour.

== Schedule ==
The following table lists official events during the 2005 season.

Date	Tournament	Host country	Purse	Winner (Note: The number in brackets after each winner's name is the number of Nordic Golf League events they had won up to and including that tournament. It is rare for someone to accumulate many wins on the Nordic Golf League as success at this level usually leads to promotion to the Challenge Tour.)
28 Apr	Berlingske Open	Denmark	€15,000	(Finland) Ville Karhu (1)
6 May	Eurocard Open	Denmark	€15,000	(Norway) Morten Hagen (3)
8 May	DnB Open	Norway	€15,000	(Sweden) Fredrick Månsson (3)
10 May	Telia Tour Opening	Sweden	SKr 110,000	(Sweden) Erik Algulin (1)
15 May	Wavin Open	Denmark	€25,000	(Denmark) Knud Storgaard (1)
22 May	Gambro Open	Sweden	SKr 175,000	(Sweden) Jimmy Kawalec (2)
28 May	Danfoss Open	Denmark	€15,000	(Denmark) Allan Høgh Madsen (2)
28 May	Fujitsu-Siemens Open	Norway	€15,000	(Norway) Lars Brovold (1)
29 May	Finnish Golf Tour Opening	Finland	€12,000	(Finland) Panu Kylliäinen (2)
5 Jun	Kinnaborg Open	Sweden	SKr 200,000	(Sweden) Niklas Bruzelius (1)
12 Jun	Sonera Open	Finland	€15,000	(Finland) Antti Ahokas (a) (1)
12 Jun	St Ibb Open	Sweden	SKr 250,000	(Sweden) Fredrik Söderström (3)
18 Jun	Gant Open	Norway	€15,000	(Finland) Erik Stenman (2)
19 Jun	Husqvarna Open	Sweden	SKr 350,000	(Sweden) Hans Edberg (2)
25 Jun	Sydbank Open	Denmark	€25,000	(Denmark) Steen Ottosen (1)
2 Jul	IBM/teetime.dk Open	Denmark	€15,000	(Sweden) Lars Edvinson (1)
2 Jul	SM Match	Sweden	SKr 200,000	(Sweden) Mattias Nilsson (1)
7 Jul	Centrebet Open	Denmark	€15,000	(Denmark) Mark Haastrup (a) (1)
10 Jul	FGT 3	Finland	€12,000	(Finland) Eero Kangasniemi (1)
10 Jul	Vestfold Open	Norway	€12,000	(Norway) Henrik Bjørnstad (1)
23 Jul	Gävle Energi Open	Sweden	SKr 200,000	(Finland) Panu Kylliäinen (3)
28 Jul	Logida Open	Denmark	€12,000	(Sweden) Åke Nilsson (2)
5 Aug	Willis Open	Denmark	€15,000	(Sweden) Per G. Nyman (1)
7 Aug	Hansabanka Baltic Open	Latvia	€30,000	(Sweden) Fredrick Månsson (4)
11 Aug	Telehuset Open	Norway	€15,000	(Norway) Ross Robertson (1)
14 Aug	Marienlyst Open	Denmark	€25,000	(Denmark) Søren Juul (2)
26 Aug	Swedish International	Sweden	SKr 200,000	(Norway) Morten Hagen (4)
3 Sep	Västerås Open	Sweden	SKr 250,000	(Sweden) Tony Edlund (1)
3 Sep	Hydro-Texaco Open	Norway	€15,000	(Sweden) Christian Nilsson (2)
4 Sep	Holiday Club Open	Finland	€12,000	(Finland) Ari Savolainen (2)
5 Sep	Base1 Open	Denmark	€15,000	(Sweden) Raimo Sjöberg (1)
9 Sep	Bornholm Open	Denmark	€12,000	(Sweden) Raimo Sjöberg (2)
11 Sep	Gant Open	Finland	€15,000	(Finland) Ari Savolainen (3)
18 Sep	Danica Pension Open	Denmark	€12,000	(Sweden) Gustav Nyblom (1)
2 Oct	Danparcs Open	Denmark	€12,000	(Finland) Panu Kylliäinen (4)
9 Oct	Öresund Masters	Sweden	SKr 600,000	(Sweden) Christian Nilsson (3)

== Order of Merit ==
The Order of Merit was based on tournament results during the season, calculated using a points-based system. The top five players on the Order of Merit (not otherwise exempt) earned status to play on the 2006 Challenge Tour.

Position	Player	Points	Status earned
1	(Norway) Morten Hagen	2,509	Promoted to Challenge Tour
2	(Sweden) Christian Nilsson	1,848	Qualified for European Tour (Top 25 in Q School)
3	(Finland) Tuomas Tuovinen	1,715	Qualified for European Tour (Top 25 in Q School)
4	(Finland) Panu Kylliäinen	1,670	Promoted to Challenge Tour
5	(Sweden) Fredrik Söderström	1,336	Promoted to Challenge Tour
6	(Sweden) Markus Westerberg	1,294	Promoted to Challenge Tour
7	(Finland) Mikko Korhonen	1,253	Promoted to Challenge Tour
8	(Sweden) Jimmy Kawalec	1,215	
9	(Finland) Jaakko Mäkitalo	1,204	
10	(Sweden) Raimo Sjöberg	1,157	

== See also ==
- 2005 Danish Golf Tour
- 2005 Finnish Tour
- 2005 Norwegian Golf Tour
- 2005 Swedish Golf Tour
