= 2002 Nordic Golf League =

Golf tour season

2002 Nordic Golf League season
- Duration: 4 May 2002 – 26 September 2002
- Number of official events: 23
- Most wins: (Sweden) Joakim Kristiansson (3)
- Order of Merit: (Sweden) Joakim Kristiansson

The 2002 Nordic Golf League was the fourth season of the Nordic Golf League, a third-tier tour recognised by the European Tour.

== Schedule ==
The following table lists official events during the 2002 season.

Date	Tournament	Host country	Purse	Winner (Note: The number in brackets after each winner's name is the number of Nordic Golf League events they had won up to and including that tournament. It is rare for someone to accumulate many wins on the Nordic Golf League as success at this level usually leads to promotion to the Challenge Tour.)
5 May	Audi Open	Norway	€8,000	(Sweden) Markus Westerberg (2)
8 May	Titleist Open	Denmark	€15,000	(Denmark) Jesper Lassen Nielsen (1)
15 May	Telia Grand Opening	Sweden	SKr 100,000	(Sweden) Johan Edfors (1)
25 May	Telehuset Larvik Open	Norway	€8,000	(Sweden) Christian Nilsson (1)
26 May	Intersport Open	Finland	€8,000	(Finland) Mikael Piltz (6)
26 May	Kinnaborg Open	Sweden	SKr 175,000	(Sweden) Joakim Kristiansson (1)
1 Jun	St Ibb Open	Sweden	SKr 230,000	(Sweden) Fredrik Orest (1)
16 Jun	Affecto Open	Finland	€8,000	(Finland) Kalle Aitala (1)
16 Jun	Husqvarna Open	Sweden	SKr 300,000	(Sweden) Hans Edberg (1)
30 Jun	Messilä Trophy	Finland	€8,000	(Finland) Toni Karjalainen (1)
30 Jun	SM Match	Sweden	SKr 300,000	(Sweden) Fredrik Orest (2)
30 Jun	Telia Open	Denmark	€34,000	(Denmark) Jakob Borregaard (1)
14 Jul	Sundbyholm Open	Sweden	SKr 250,000	(Sweden) Max Anglert (1)
26 Jul	Gibson Scandinavia Brollsta Open	Sweden	SKr 175,000	(Sweden) Marcus Norgren (2)
8 Aug	TietoEnator Open	Sweden	SKr 175,000	(Sweden) Joakim Kristiansson (2)
17 Aug	Gula Sidorna Open	Sweden	SKr 250,000	(Sweden) Hampus von Post (2)
18 Aug	Kotka Golf Center Open	Finland	€8,000	(Finland) Panu Kylliäinen (1)
25 Aug	Griffin Open	Denmark	€27,000	(Denmark) Morten Backhausen (1)
30 Aug	match.golf.se	Sweden	SKr 200,000	(Sweden) Joakim Kristiansson (3)
7 Sep	Västerås Open	Sweden	SKr 250,000	(Sweden) Jonas Wåhlstedt (1)
8 Sep	Holiday Club Open	Finland	€8,000	(Sweden) Peter Gustafsson (3)
22 Sep	St Arild Open	Sweden	SKr 175,000	(Sweden) Martin Erlandsson (1)
26 Sep	Wilson Open	Denmark	€15,000	(Denmark) Thomas Nørret (1)

== Order of Merit ==
The Order of Merit was based on tournament results during the season, calculated using a points-based system. The top four players on the Order of Merit (not otherwise exempt) earned status to play on the 2003 Challenge Tour.

Position	Player	Points	Status earned
1	(Sweden) Joakim Kristiansson	1,990	Promoted to Challenge Tour
2	(Sweden) Fredrik Orest	1,897	Qualified for European Tour (Top 25 in Q School)
3	(Sweden) Markus Westerberg	1,749	Promoted to Challenge Tour
4	(Denmark) Thomas Nørret	1,601	Finished in Top 80 of Challenge Tour Rankings
5	(Sweden) Peter Gustafsson	1,585	Promoted to Challenge Tour
6	(Sweden) Johan Edfors	1,401	Promoted to Challenge Tour
7	(Sweden) Jonas Wåhlstedt	1,310	
8	(Denmark) Jesper Lassen Nielsen	1,032	
9	(Finland) Tuomas Tuovinen	1,006	
10	(Sweden) Christian Nilsson	978	

== See also ==
- 2002 Finnish Tour
- 2002 Swedish Golf Tour
