= 2004 Nordic Golf League =

Golf tour season

2004 Nordic Golf League season
- Duration: 22 April 2004 – 24 September 2004
- Number of official events: 31
- Most wins: (Sweden) Peter Viktor (3)
- Order of Merit: (Sweden) Peter Malmgren

The 2004 Nordic Golf League was the sixth season of the Nordic Golf League, a third-tier tour recognised by the European Tour.

== Schedule ==
The following table lists official events during the 2004 season.

Date	Tournament	Host country	Purse	Winner (Note: The number in brackets after each winner's name is the number of Nordic Golf League events they had won up to and including that tournament. It is rare for someone to accumulate many wins on the Nordic Golf League as success at this level usually leads to promotion to the Challenge Tour.)
24 Apr	Wilson Open	Denmark	€25,000	(Denmark) Søren Juul (1)
29 Apr	Royal Oak Open	Denmark	€15,000	(Sweden) Peter Viktor (1)
11 May	Telia Grand Opening	Sweden	SKr 100,000	(Sweden) Eric Carlberg (1)
16 May	Gambro Open	Sweden	SKr 175,000	(Sweden) Björn Bäck (4)
23 May	Danica Pension Masters	Denmark	€25,000	(Denmark) Michael Jürgensen (1)
30 May	Rönnebäck Open	Sweden	SKr 250,000	(Sweden) Peter Viktor (2)
30 May	Fujitsu Siemens Open	Norway	€15,000	(Norway) Morten Hagen (2)
6 Jun	Finnish Golf Tour Opening	Finland	€10,000	(Finland) Erik Stenman (a) (1)
6 Jun	Kinnaborg Open	Sweden	SKr 200,000	(Sweden) Magnus A. Carlsson (1)
11 Jun	Gant Open	Norway	€15,000	(Norway) Thomas Hansen (1)
13 Jun	St Ibb Open	Sweden	SKr 250,000	(Sweden) Linus Pettersson (2)
20 Jun	Sonera Open	Finland	€10,000	(Finland) Roope Kakko (a) (1)
20 Jun	Husqvarna Open	Sweden	SKr 350,000	(Sweden) Patrik Sjöland (1)
24 Jun	KIA Open	Denmark	€15,000	(Sweden) Fredrik Söderström (2)
27 Jun	Hydro-Texaco Open	Norway	€15,000	(Norway) Eirik Tage Johansen (a) (1)
3 Jul	Brande Open	Denmark	€25,000	(Sweden) Peter Viktor (3)
3 Jul	SM Match	Sweden	SKr 200,000	(Sweden) Magnus A. Carlsson (2)
9 Jul	Saltsjöbadskannan	Sweden	SKr 150,000	(Sweden) Eric Carlberg (2)
11 Jul	Gant Open	Finland	€10,000	(Finland) Jaakko Mäkitalo (1)
25 Jul	Birkebeiner Open	Norway	€15,000	(Sweden) David Jonsson (1)
1 Aug	Hansabanka Baltic Open	Latvia	€26,000	(Sweden) Peter Malmgren (2)
3 Aug	Hjarbæk Open	Denmark	€15,000	(Sweden) Joakim Bäckström (3)
8 Aug	Waxholm Open	Sweden	SKr 200,000	(Sweden) Björn Pettersson (1)
11 Aug	Trehöje Open	Denmark	€25,000	(Sweden) Dale Harris (1)
19 Aug	ECCO Open - Danish PGA Championship	Denmark	€40,000	(Sweden) Niclas Gyllengahm (a) (1)
20 Aug	Swedish International	Sweden	SKr 200,000	(Sweden) Hampus von Post (5)
29 Aug	Kaupthing Bank Open	Finland	€10,000	(Finland) Jaakko Mäkitalo (2)
4 Sep	Västerås Open	Sweden	SKr 250,000	(Finland) Thomas Sundström (2)
5 Sep	P4 Tour Open	Norway	€15,000	(Norway) Thomas Nielsen (1)
12 Sep	Holiday Club Open	Finland	€10,000	(Finland) Matti Meriläinen (a) (1)
24 Sep	Nordic League Final	Denmark	€27,000	(Norway) Øyvind Rojahn (3)

== Order of Merit ==
The Order of Merit was based on tournament results during the season, calculated using a points-based system. The top five players on the Order of Merit earned status to play on the 2005 Challenge Tour.

Position	Player	Points	Status earned
1	(Sweden) Peter Malmgren	1,974	Promoted to Challenge Tour
2	(Sweden) Magnus A. Carlsson	1,840	Promoted to Challenge Tour
3	(Finland) Thomas Sundström	1,821	Promoted to Challenge Tour
4	(Sweden) Eric Carlberg	1,651	Promoted to Challenge Tour
5	(Norway) Thomas Nielsen	1,605	Promoted to Challenge Tour
6	(Sweden) Paul Nilbrink	1,557	Promoted to Challenge Tour (Note: Earned Challenge Tour status by finishing third on the 2004 EPD Tour Order of Merit.)
7	(Denmark) Peter Jesperson	1,499	
8	(Sweden) Hampus von Post	1,419	
9	(Sweden) Dale Harris	1,319	
10	(Sweden) Linus Pettersson	1,310	

== See also ==
- 2004 Danish Golf Tour
- 2004 Finnish Tour
- 2004 Norwegian Golf Tour
- 2004 Swedish Golf Tour
