= Iberdrola Open =

Tournament information
- Location: Mallorca, Spain
- Established: 2010
- Course: Pula Golf Club
- Par: 70
- Length: 6,915 yards (6,323 m)
- Tour: European Tour
- Format: Stroke play
- Prize fund: €1,000,000
- Month played: May
- Final year: 2011

Tournament record score
- Aggregate: 274 Alejandro Cañizares (2010); 274 Peter Hanson (2010); 274 Darren Clarke (2011)
- To par: −6 as above

Final champion
- (Northern Ireland) Darren Clarke
- Location in Spain Location in the Balearic Islands Location in Mallorca

The Iberdrola Open was a European Tour golf tournament which was played in 2010 and 2011 at Pula Golf Club, Son Servera on the island of Mallorca in Spain. The tournament was cancelled in 2012 due to lack of sponsorship.

The venue had previously been the host of the Mallorca Classic, a former tournament on the European Tour. The prize fund in the first year was € 800,000 (about US$1.01 million).

== Winners ==
Year	Winner	Score	To par	Margin of victory	Runner(s)-up
Iberdrola Open
2012	Cancelled due to lack of sponsorship				
2011	(Northern Ireland) Darren Clarke	274	−6	3 strokes	(England) David Lynn (England) Chris Wood
Iberdrola Open Cala Millor Mallorca
2010	(Sweden) Peter Hanson	274	−6	Playoff	(Spain) Alejandro Cañizares
