= Henrik Bjørnstad =

Norwegian professional golfer

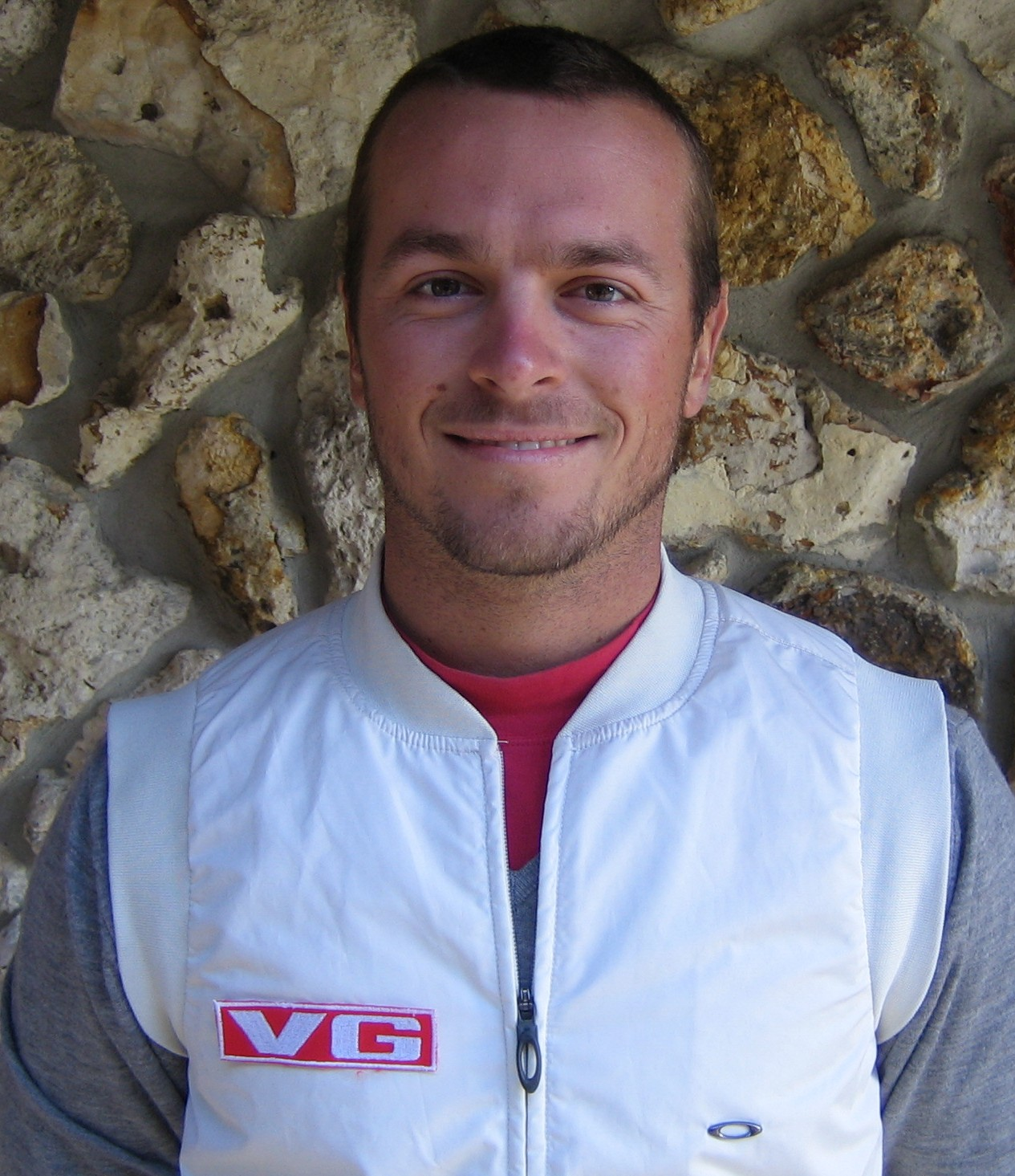

Personal information
- Full name: Henrik Bjørnstad
- Nationality: Norway
- Born: 7 May 1979 (age 47) Oslo, Norway
- Height: 5 ft 8 in (1.73 m)
- Weight: 163 lb (74 kg; 11.6 st)
- Spouse: Camilla Bartnes

Career
- Sport: Golf
- Turned professional: 1997
- Former tours: PGA Tour; European Tour; Nationwide Tour
- Professional wins: 1

Henrik Bjørnstad (born 7 May 1979) is a Norwegian former professional golfer.

== Early life ==
Bjørnstad was born in Oslo, Norway.

== Professional career ==
In 1997, Bjørnstad turned professional. He became the first Norwegian on the PGA Tour when he qualified with a tied 13th-place finish at the 2005 PGA Tour Qualifying Tournament. He previously played on the European Tour in 1999 and from 2001 to 2004.

The first season on the PGA Tour resulted in one top 10 finish and 17 cuts made in 31 starts. Resulting in ranking at 152nd place on the PGA Tour Money list.

In 2007 to 2009 Bjørnstad played on the U.S.-based Nationwide Tour. In 2009, Bjørnstad secured his playing rights on the PGA Tour for the second time by finishing within the top 25 on the money list. His final position was 18th. However, having again finished outside the top-150 on the PGA Tour money list, he was reported at the end of 2010 as saying he was quitting professional golf.

== Personal life ==
Bjørnstad resides in Palm Beach Gardens, Florida.

== Amateur wins ==
- 1996 Norwegian Amateur

== Professional wins (1) ==
=== Nordic Golf League wins (1) ===
No.	Date	Tournament	Winning score	Margin of victory	Runners-up
1	10 Jul 2005	Vestfold Open	−10 (73-67-66=206)	4 strokes	(Norway) Martin Dahl, (Norway) Morten Hagen

== Playoff record ==
Nationwide Tour playoff record (0–1)

No.	Year	Tournament	Opponent	Result
1	2008	Henrico County Open	(Australia) Greg Chalmers	Lost to bogey on second extra hole

== Team appearances ==
Amateur

- European Boys' Team Championship (representing Norway): 1995, 1996
- Jacques Léglise Trophy (representing the Continent of Europe): 1996 (winners)
- Eisenhower Trophy (representing Norway): 1996

Professional

- World Cup (representing Norway): 2001

== See also ==
- 2005 PGA Tour Qualifying School graduates
- 2009 Nationwide Tour graduates
