= 2007 Nordic Golf League =

Golf tour season

2007 Nordic Golf League season
- Duration: 21 February 2007 – 14 October 2007
- Number of official events: 38 (Note: A further two tournaments were scheduled but were cancelled.)
- Most wins: (Denmark) Peter Ankersø (3) (Sweden) Rikard Karlberg (3) (Sweden) Joakim Rask (3)
- Order of Merit: (Sweden) Rikard Karlberg

The 2007 Nordic Golf League was the ninth season of the Nordic Golf League, a third-tier tour recognised by the European Tour.

== Schedule ==
The following table lists official events during the 2007 season.

Date	Tournament	Host country	Purse	Winner (Note: The number in brackets after each winner's name is the number of Nordic Golf League events they had won up to and including that tournament. It is rare for someone to accumulate many wins on the Nordic Golf League as success at this level usually leads to promotion to the Challenge Tour.)	Other tours (Note: CHA − Challenge Tour.)
23 Feb	Backtee Open I	Portugal	€10,000	(Denmark) Brian Akstrup (1)	
2 Mar	Backtee Open II	Portugal	€15,000	(Finland) Janne Mommo (1)	
9 Mar	Backtee Championship	Portugal	€10,000	(Sweden) Robert Eriksson (1)	
20 Apr	Danfoss/Nykredit Open	Denmark	€15,000	(Sweden) Robert Johansén (2)	
26 Apr	Rømø Golf & Wellness Open	Denmark	€15,000	(Sweden) Andreas Högberg (1)	
3 May	Brundtland Open	Denmark	DKr 225,000	(Denmark) Anders Schmidt Hansen (2)	
10 May	Smørum Golfcenter Open	Denmark	€15,000	(Finland) Erik Stenman (3)	
13 May	St Ibb Open	Sweden	SKr 250,000	(Sweden) Rikard Karlberg (2)	
13 May	DnB NOR Open	Norway	€15,000	(Norway) Marius Thorp (1)	
17 May	Finansbanken Open	Denmark	€15,000	(Denmark) Peter Ankersø (2)	
18 May	Gambro Open	Sweden	SKr 200,000	(Sweden) Ludwig Nordeklint (1)	
27 May	PayEx Masters	Norway	€25,000	(Sweden) Tony Edlund (3)	
2 Jun	Dangaard Telecom Masters	Denmark	DKr 300,000	(Denmark) Jeppe Huldahl (1)	
3 Jun	FGT Opening	Finland	€15,000	(Finland) Janne Mommo (2)	
3 Jun	Kinnaborg Open	Sweden	SKr 200,000	(Sweden) Daniel Lindgren (2)	
10 Jun	Telia Open	Sweden	SKr 275,000	(Sweden) Joakim Rask (3)	
17 Jun	Husqvarna Open	Sweden	SKr 500,000	(Sweden) Johan Wahlqvist (1)	
23 Jun	Bornholm Masters	Denmark	€25,000	(Norway) Christian Aronsen (2)	
27 Jun	Multidata Masters	Denmark	DKr 300,000	(Denmark) Andreas Kali (1)	
28 Jun	Ishøj Golf Center Open	Denmark	DKr 225,000	(Sweden) Marcus Palm (1)	
1 Jul	Nordialog Open	Norway	€15,000	(Sweden) Fredrick Månsson (5)	
8 Jul	Skåne Open	Sweden	SKr 250,000	(Norway) Christian Aronsen (3)	
15 Jul	Sunny Trading Finnish Open	Finland	€25,000	(Finland) Thomas Sundström (3)	
22 Jul	Centrebet Open	Denmark	€15,000	(Denmark) Joachim H. Larsen (1)	
29 Jul	Hansabanka Baltic Open	Latvia	€55,000	(Sweden) Andreas Högberg (2)	
5 Aug	Willis Masters	Denmark	DKr 225,000	(Sweden) Matthew Bliss (1)	
8 Aug	Handelsbanken Finans Open	Denmark	DKr 240,000	(Denmark) Kristian Nielsen (1)	
11 Aug	PGA Landmann Open	Sweden	SKr 500,000	(Sweden) Rikard Karlberg (3)	
19 Aug	St Laurence Open	Finland	€15,000	(Finland) Joonas Granberg (a) (1)	
19 Aug	Weber Masters	Denmark	DKr 300,000	(Denmark) Knud Storgaard (2)	
24 Aug	SM Match	Sweden	SKr 450,000	(Sweden) Andreas Andersson (2)	
~~26 Aug~~	Thomas Bjørn Open	Denmark	–	Cancelled	
1 Sep	Västerås Mälarstaden Open	Sweden	SKr 200,000	(Sweden) Joakim Rask (4)	
2 Sep	ECCO Tour Championship	Denmark	€130,000	(England) Iain Pyman (n/a)	CHA
9 Sep	Sony Ericsson Open	Norway	€25,000	(Denmark) Peter Ankersø (3)	
~~16 Sep~~	HimmerLand National Pro-Am	Denmark	–	Cancelled	
23 Sep	EGCC Open	Estonia	€25,000	(Sweden) Joakim Rask (5)	
30 Sep	TourGolf Open	Sweden	SKr 350,000	(Sweden) Jonas Pettersson (1)	
7 Oct	SUN-AIR Open	Denmark	€15,000	(Denmark) Peter Ankersø (4)	
14 Oct	Unibake Masters	Denmark	DKr 300,000	(Sweden) Rikard Karlberg (4)	

== Order of Merit ==
The Order of Merit was based on tournament results during the season, calculated using a points-based system. The top five players on the Order of Merit (not otherwise exempt) earned status to play on the 2008 Challenge Tour.

Position	Player	Points	Status earned
1	(Sweden) Rikard Karlberg	25,005	Promoted to Challenge Tour
2	(Sweden) Joakim Rask	20,211	Promoted to Challenge Tour
3	(Sweden) Johan Wahlqvist	20,041	Promoted to Challenge Tour
4	(Sweden) Andreas Högberg	19,741	Qualified for Challenge Tour (made cut in Q School)
5	(Sweden) Matthew Bliss	16,578	Promoted to Challenge Tour
6	(Sweden) Andreas Andersson	15,493	Promoted to Challenge Tour
7	(Denmark) Peter Ankersø	14,972	
8	(Norway) Christian Aronsen	14,313	
9	(Denmark) Michael Jürgensen	13,013	
10	(Sweden) Niklas Bruzelius	12,951	

== See also ==
- 2007 Danish Golf Tour
- 2007 Finnish Tour
- 2007 Norwegian Golf Tour
- 2007 Swedish Golf Tour
