= Pelle Edberg =

Swedish professional golfer

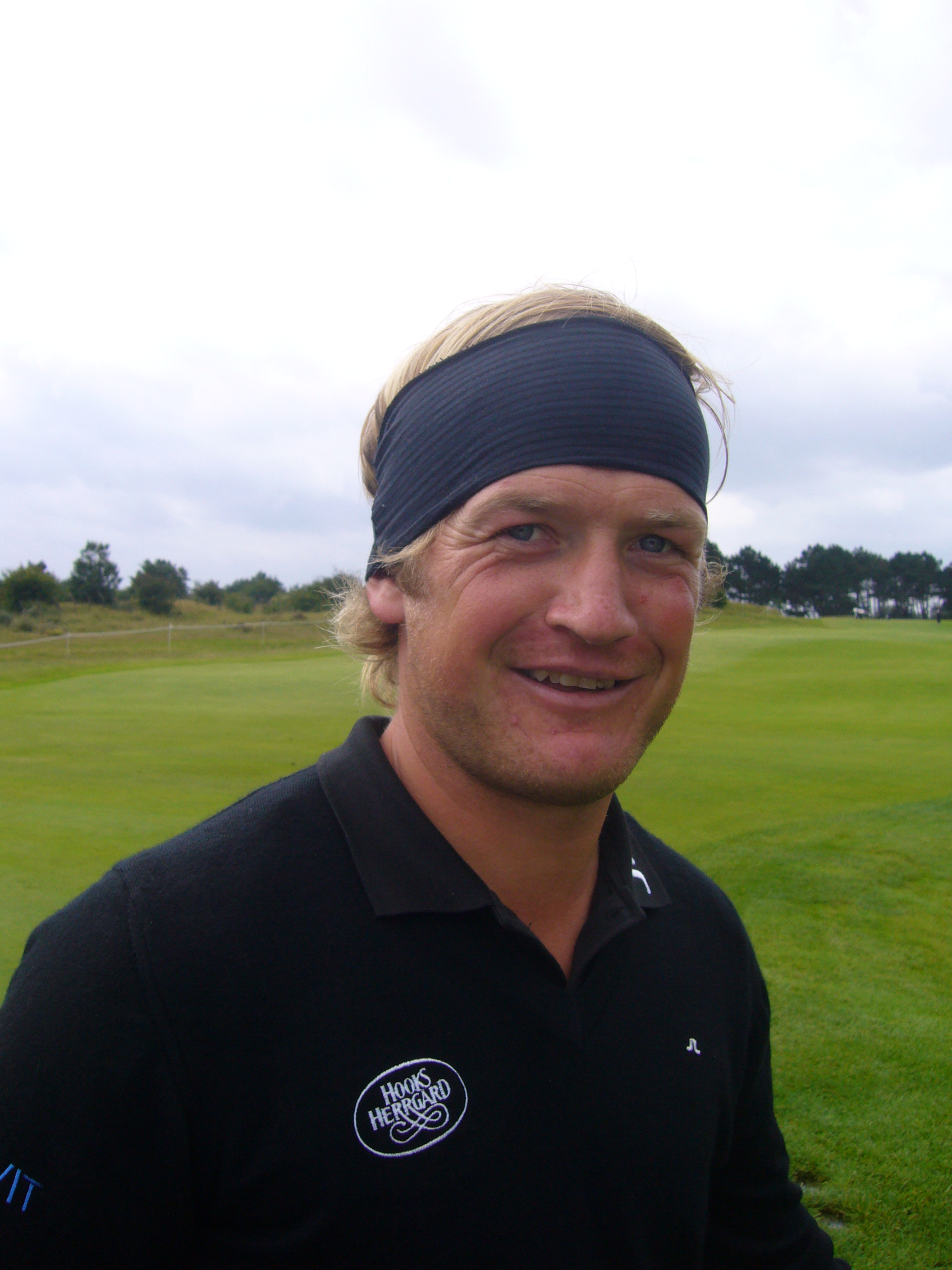

Personal information
- Full name: Per Oscar Edberg
- Nickname: Pelle
- Nationality: Sweden
- Born: 13 April 1979 (age 47) Jönköping, Sweden
- Height: 1.78 m (5 ft 10 in)

Career
- Sport: Golf
- Turned professional: 1997
- Current tour: Nordic Golf League
- Former tours: European Tour; Challenge Tour
- Professional wins: 6

Best results in major championships
- Masters Tournament: DNP
- PGA Championship: DNP
- U.S. Open: DNP
- The Open Championship: T12: 2007

Per Oscar "Pelle" Edberg (born 13 April 1979) is a Swedish professional golfer and former European Tour player. He was runner-up at the 2008 SAS Masters, the 2010 Saint-Omer Open, and the 2015 D+D Real Czech Masters.

== Early life ==
Edberg was born and grew up in Jönköping, Sweden, as the youngest of four sons to Stefan Edberg, the owner of Hook Golf Club, situated 30 kilometers south of the city of Jönköping. Edberg and his brothers Hans, Jonas and Calle all spend a lot of their childhoods at the golf course. His brother Hans, who also became a golf professional and twice a winner on the Swedish Golf Tour, has always trained and supported him.

Without the possibility to go to college in America or combine golf training with studies at upper secondary sports school in Sweden, Edberg turned professional at 17 years of age.

== Professional career ==
After several unsuccessful attempts at the European Tour qualifying school, Edberg finally gained his tour card in 2004, having played most of that year on the second tier Challenge Tour.

Edberg failed to retain his playing privileges on the European Tour in his rookie season, and after a year of limited opportunities in 2006, regained his tour card for 2007 at final qualifying school. In 2007 he finished tied for 12th place at the 136th Open Championship played at Carnoustie Golf Links in Scotland, and had three top-10 finishes, including a tie for 3rd at the Smurfit European Open. He finished the season ranked in 51st position on the 2007 European Tour Order of Merit.

In 2008 Edberg continued his consistent play, ending the season in 85th place on the Order of Merit, recording his best finish on tour to date along the way, a share of 2nd place at the SAS Masters in Stockholm in his home country.

Having spent 2012–2014 mainly on the Challenge Tour, Edberg re-qualified to the European Tour in 2014 and had the second best year of his career in 2015, finishing runner up in the D+D Real Czech Masters, third at the Porsche European Open and fourth at the Omega European Masters, for a 71st place in the Race to Dubai.

On 4 September 2020, Edberg, at 41 years of age, came back to winning, by claiming his first professional win in 14 years, when he won the TanumStrand Fjällbacka Open on the Nordic Golf League and Swedish Golf Tour, with a 15 under par score, leading wire to wire.

== Professional wins (6) ==
=== Nordic Golf League wins (5) ===
| No. | Date | Tournament | Winning score | Margin of victory | Runner(s)-up |
|---|---|---|---|---|---|
| 1 | 13 May 2003 | Telia Grand Opening | −2 (67-71=138) | Playoff | (Sweden) Christian Nilsson |
| 2 | 8 Jun 2003 | Rönnebäck Open | −13 (66-68-69=203) | 1 stroke | (Sweden) Steven Jeppesen |
| 3 | 14 Aug 2003 | Sundbyholm Open | −8 (68-70-70=208) | 4 strokes | (Sweden) Pontus Leijon, (Sweden) Kristoffer Svensson, (Sweden) Leif Westerberg |
| 4 | 1 Oct 2006 | TourGolf Masters | −20 (69-69-67-63=268) | 1 stroke | (Sweden) Niklas Bruzelius |
| 5 | 4 Sep 2020 | TanumStrand Fjällbacka Open | −15 (65-65-69=198) | 3 strokes | (Norway) Jarand Ekeland Arnøy |

=== Other wins (1) ===
| No. | Date | Tournament | Winning score | Margin of victory | Runner-up |
|---|---|---|---|---|---|
| 1 | 7 May 2000 | Bankboken Tour 21 Pojkar #1 | −5 (70-67-74=211) | 7 strokes | (Sweden) Anders Sjöstrand |

== Playoff record ==
Challenge Tour playoff record (0–1)

| No. | Year | Tournament | Opponent | Result |
|---|---|---|---|---|
| 1 | 2011 | Roma Golf Open | (England) Sam Little | Lost to par on fourth extra hole |

== Results in major championships ==
| Tournament | 2007 | 2008 | 2009 | 2010 | 2011 | 2012 | 2013 | 2014 | 2015 |
|---|---|---|---|---|---|---|---|---|---|
| Masters Tournament | | | | | | | | | |
| U.S. Open | | | | | | | | | |
| The Open Championship | T12 | CUT | | | | | | | CUT |
| PGA Championship | | | | | | | | | |

Did not play

CUT = missed the half-way cut
"T" = tied

== European Tour career summary ==
| Season | Starts | Cuts made | Wins | 2nd | 3rd | Top 10 | Earnings (€) | Money list rank |
|---|---|---|---|---|---|---|---|---|
| 2004 | 1 | – | – | – | – | – | – | – |
| 2005 | 25 | 9 | – | – | – | – | 50,701 | 177 |
| 2006 | 4 | 3 | – | – | – | – | 15,804 | 236 |
| 2007 | 28 | 14 | – | – | 1 | 3 | 629,614 | 51 |
| 2008 | 30 | 14 | – | 1 | 1 | 3 | 366,001 | 85 |
| 2009 | 34 | 19 | – | – | – | 1 | 213,653 | 132 |
| 2010 | 19 | 11 | – | 1 | – | 3 | 196,218 | 119 |
| 2011 | 11 | 1 | – | – | – | – | 1,491 | 321 |
| 2012 | 11 | 4 | – | – | – | 2 | 85,918 | 162 |
| 2013 | 2 | 2 | – | – | – | 1 | 21,330 | 217 |
| 2014 | 2 | 1 | – | – | – | – | – | – |
| 2015 | 25 | 10 | – | 1 | 1 | 4 | 463,740 | 71 |
| 2016 | 30 | 15 | – | – | – | 2 | 275,551 | 100 |
| 2017 | 10 | 4 | – | – | – | – | 51,885 | 203 |
| 2018 | 5 | – | – | – | – | – | – | – |
| 2019 | 9 | – | – | – | – | – | 9,480 | – |
| Career* | 246 | 108 | – | 3 | 3 | 19 | 2,383,419 | 258 |

*As of the 2019 season.

== See also ==
- 2006 European Tour Qualifying School graduates
- 2011 Challenge Tour graduates
- 2014 European Tour Qualifying School graduates
