= Husqvarna Open =

Tournament information
- Location: Jönköping, Sweden
- Established: 1993
- Course: Jönköping Golf Club
- Par: 70
- Tours: Nordic Golf League; Swedish Golf Tour
- Format: Stroke play
- Prize fund: kr 500,000
- Month played: June
- Final year: 2008

Tournament record score
- Aggregate: 194 Hampus von Post (203)
- To par: −16 as above

Final champion
- (Sweden) Johan Bjerhag

Location map
- Location in Sweden

The Husqvarna Open was a golf tournament on the Swedish Golf Tour. It was held between 1993 and 2008 at Jönköping Golf Club in Jönköping, Sweden.

== Winners ==
Year	Tour (Note: NGL − Nordic Golf League; SWE − Swedish Golf Tour.)	Winner	Score	To par	Margin of victory	Runner(s)-up	Ref.
2008	NGL	(Sweden) Johan Bjerhag	195	−15	6 strokes	(Denmark) Oliver Suhr	
2007	NGL	(Sweden) Johan Wahlqvist	196	−14	6 strokes	(Sweden) Matthew Bliss	
2006	NGL	(Sweden) Fredrik Orest	196	−14	Playoff	(Sweden) Tony Edlund	
2005	NGL	(Sweden) Hans Edberg	197	−13	2 strokes	(Sweden) Björn Bäck	
2004	NGL	(Sweden) Patrik Sjöland	133	−7	2 strokes	(Sweden) Daniel Lindgren (Finland) Thomas Sundström	
2003	NGL	(Sweden) Hampus von Post	194	−16	2 strokes	(Sweden) Fredrik Henge	
2002	NGL	(Sweden) Hans Edberg	202	−8	Playoff	(Sweden) Patrik Sjöland	
2001	NGL	(Sweden) Johan Bjerhag	201	−9	1 stroke	(Sweden) Jonas Wåhlstedt	
2000	NGL	(Sweden) Kristofer Svensson	197	−13	2 strokes	(Sweden) Hampus von Post	
1999	NGL	(Sweden) Björn Pettersson	203	−7	1 stroke	(Sweden) Fredrick Månsson	
1998	SWE	(Sweden) Peter Hanson (a)	198	−12	2 strokes	(Norway) Morten Haerås	
1997	SWE	(Sweden) Mikael Lundberg	199	−11	1 stroke	(Sweden) Patrik Sjöland	
1996: No tournament
1995	SWE	(Sweden) Per Nyman	203	−7	2 strokes	(Sweden) Terry Burgoyne (Sweden) Mats Sterner	
1994	SWE	(Sweden) Anders Haglund	203	−7	Playoff	(Iceland) Úlfar Jónsson	
1993	SWE	(Sweden) Lars Tingvall	206	−4	2 strokes	(Sweden) Patrik Sjöland	
