= St Ibb Open =

Tournament information
- Location: Ven, Sweden
- Established: 2000
- Course: St Ibb Golf Club
- Par: 68
- Tour: Nordic Golf League
- Format: Modified stableford
- Prize fund: kr 300,000
- Month played: July
- Final year: 2010

Tournament record score
- Score: 40 points Jens Dantorp (2009); 40 points Victor Almström (2010)

Final champion
- (Sweden) Victor Almström

Location map
- Location in Sweden

The St Ibb Open was a golf tournament on the Swedish Golf Tour and the Nordic Golf League. It was held at St Ibb Golf Club on the island of Ven in the Øresund strait, between Sweden and Denmark.

The tournament used a modified Stableford scoring format on the par-68 course.

== Winners ==
Year	Winner	Score	Margin of victory	Runner(s)-up	Ref.
2010	(Sweden) Victor Almström	40 points	6 points	(Sweden) Per Barth	
2009	(Sweden) Jens Dantorp	40 points	11 points	(Sweden) Lars Johansson	
2008: No tournament
2007	(Sweden) Rikard Karlberg	27 points	2 points	(Sweden) Pehr Magnebrant (Sweden) Fredrik Söderström	
2006	(Sweden) Per Barth	21 points	2 points	(Sweden) Niklas Bruzelius	
2005	(Sweden) Fredrik Söderström			(Sweden) Henrik Allenbrant (Sweden) Niklas Bruzelius	
2004	(Sweden) Linus Pettersson (a)			(Denmark) Peter Jespersen	
2003	(Sweden) Åke Nilsson			(Sweden) Johan Annerfelt (Sweden) Christian Nilsson	
2002	(Sweden) Fredrik Orest			(Sweden) Markus Westerberg	
2001	(Sweden) Björn Pettersson			(Sweden) Christian Nilsson (Sweden) Mats Sterner	
2000	(Sweden) Kristofer Svensson			(Sweden) Andreaz Lindberg (Sweden) Mats Sterner	
