= Joakim Rask =

Swedish professional golfer

Personal information
- Nationality: Sweden
- Born: 8 January 1972 (age 54) Katrineholm, Sweden
- Height: 1.88 m (6 ft 2 in)
- Weight: 102 kg (225 lb; 16.1 st)

Career
- Sport: Golf
- Turned professional: 1992
- Former tours: European Tour; Challenge Tour; Nordic Golf League
- Professional wins: 11

Number of wins by tour
- Challenge Tour: 3
- Other: 8

Achievements and awards
- Swedish Golf Tour Order of Merit winner: 2009

Joakim "Jocke" Rask (born 8 January 1972) is a Swedish professional golfer.

Rask's father, a scratch golfer, taught him to play as a six-year-old and he represented the Swedish boys' team. Rask concentrated on golf after an ice-hockey injury, and turned professional in 1992 at the age of 20. He won a Challenge Tour event in his first season, and he had a great 1996 season, which saw him hold the number one rankings position for several weeks in the mid-to-late part of the season, and graduated to the European Tour.

Rask played 63 events on the European Tour 1997–2015 where his best performance was ninth at the 2001 North West of Ireland Open. His biggest check came with his tie for fourth at the 2014 Kazakhstan Open on the Challenge Tour.

== Professional wins (11) ==
=== Challenge Tour wins (3) ===
No.	Date	Tournament	Winning score	Margin of victory	Runner-up
1	30 Aug 1992	Västerås Open	−8 (67-65-67=199)	2 strokes	(Hong Kong) Ed Morton
2	9 Jun 1996	KB Golf Challenge	−17 (67-65-68-71=271)	1 stroke	(England) Greg Owen
3	8 Jun 1997	SIAB Open	−3 (67-71-71-72=281)	1 stroke	(Sweden) Kalle Brink

=== Nordic Golf League wins (8) ===
No.	Date	Tournament	Winning score	Margin of victory	Runner(s)-up
1	28 May 2000	Kinnaborg Open	−6 (71-65-68=204)	4 strokes	(Sweden) Joakim Grönhagen
2	9 Sep 2006	Thermia Open	−9 (68-72-67=207)	1 stroke	(Sweden) Pelle Edberg
3	10 Jun 2007	Telia Open	−14 (66-66-67=199)	9 strokes	(Finland) Panu Kylliäinen
4	1 Sep 2007	Västerås Mälarstaden Open	−4 (69-69-68=206)	1 stroke	(Sweden) Daniel Lindgren, (Sweden) Pehr Magnebrant
5	23 Sep 2007	EGCC Open	−3 (71-69-73=213)	2 strokes	(Finland) Matti Meriläinen
6	6 Jun 2009	Söderby Masters	−8 (72-72-67=211)	3 strokes	(Sweden) Mattias Eliasson
7	8 Jul 2011	Katrineholm Open	−11 (67-69-69=205)	1 stroke	(Sweden) Petter Bocian
8	28 Jun 2013	Mercedes-Benz Matchplay	5 and 4		(Sweden) Niclas Johansson
