= Västerås Open =

Tournament information
- Location: Västerås, Sweden
- Established: 1986
- Course: Fullerö Golfklubb
- Par: 72
- Tours: Challenge Tour; Nordic Golf League; Swedish Golf Tour
- Format: Stroke play
- Prize fund: kr 200,000
- Final year: 2009

Tournament record score
- Aggregate: 194 Peter Hanson (1997)
- To par: −13 Peter Hanson (1997) −13 Thomas Sundström (2003)

Final champion
- (Sweden) Mårten Milling
- Location in Sweden

The Västerås Open was a golf tournament on the Swedish Golf Tour that featured on the Challenge Tour 1990–1994. It was played in Västerås, Sweden.

The Kentab Open was first played as an amateur tournament at Västerås GC in 1978, and it was added to the Swedish Golf Tour in 1986. Starting in 1998 the tournament began rotating between Västerås GC, Frösåker G&CC, Ängsö GC and Fullerö GC. In 2007 Västerås Municipality became the main sponsor and it was rebranded the Västerås Mälarstaden Open.

A similarly named event, the Kentab/RBG Open, sponsored name of the 1996 Swedish PGA Championship, was played at Frösåker G&CC and featured on the 1996 Challenge Tour.

Vilhelm Forsbrand, Joakim Rask and Peter Hanson have all won the tournament twice, Hanson while still an amateur.

== Winners ==
Year	Tour (Note: CHA − Challenge Tour; NGL − Nordic Golf League; SWE − Swedish Golf Tour.)	Winner	Score	To par	Margin of victory	Runner(s)-up	Venue	Ref.
Västerås Mälarstaden Open
2009	NGL	(Sweden) Mårten Milling (a)	205	−11	1 stroke	(Denmark) Lasse Jensen (Sweden) Daniel Sandberg (Sweden) Anders Sjöstrand	Fullerö	
2008: No tournament
2007	NGL	(Sweden) Joakim Rask (2)	206	−4	1 stroke	(Sweden) Daniel Lindgren (Sweden) Pehr Magnebrant	Västerås	
Västerås Open
2006	NGL	(Sweden) Robert Eriksson	217	+1	Playoff	(Sweden) Petter Bocian	Frösåker	
2005	NGL	(Sweden) Tony Edlund	205	−5	1 stroke	(Sweden) Kalle Edberg	Västerås	
2004	NGL	(Finland) Thomas Sundström	203	−13	1 stroke	(Finland) Panu Kylliäinen	Fullerö	
2003	NGL	(Sweden) Leif Westerberg	210	−6	1 stroke	(Sweden) Magnus A. Carlsson	Frösåker	
2002	NGL	(Sweden) Jonas Wåhlstedt	196	−11	1 stroke	(Sweden) Joakim Kristiansson	Västerås	
2001	NGL	(Sweden) Fredrick Månsson	208	−8	2 strokes	(Sweden) Ola Eliasson (Sweden) David Lindqvist (Sweden) Fredrik Orest	Ängsö	
2000	NGL	(Sweden) Hampus von Post	198	−9	3 strokes	(Sweden) Per Larsson (Sweden) Joakim Persson	Västerås	
1999	NGL	(Sweden) Ville Lemon	214	−2	1 stroke	(Sweden) Fredrik Wickman	Frösåker	
1998	SWE	(Sweden) Peter Hanson (a) (2)	209	−7	1 stroke	(Sweden) Andreas Ljunggren	Ängsö	
1997	SWE	(Sweden) Peter Hanson (a)	194	−13	6 strokes	(Sweden) Johan Forsman (Sweden) Joakim Nilsson	Västerås	
1996	SWE	(Sweden) Johan Axgren	200	−7	3 strokes	(Sweden) Markus Rosenlund	Västerås	
1995	SWE	(Sweden) Lars Tingvall	207	E	1 stroke	(Sweden) Joakim Kroon (Sweden) Fredrik Persson	Västerås	
1994	CHA	(Sweden) Joakim Grönhagen	200	−7	1 stroke	(Sweden) Thomas Nilsson	Västerås	
1993	CHA	(Sweden) Niclas Fasth	197	−10	1 stroke	(Sweden) Per Nyman	Västerås	
1992	CHA	(Sweden) Joakim Rask	199	−8	2 strokes	(Hong Kong) Ed Morton	Västerås	
1991	CHA	(Sweden) Vilhelm Forsbrand (2)	202	−5	2 strokes	(England) Craig Cassells (Sweden) Anders Gillner	Västerås	
1990	CHA	(Sweden) Vilhelm Forsbrand	268	−8	2 strokes	(Sweden) Daniel Westermark	Västerås	
Västerås Kentab Open
1989	CHA	(Sweden) Clas Hultman	203	−4	3 strokes	(Norway) Per Haugsrud	Västerås	
1988	SWE	(Sweden) Johan Ryström	203	−4	1 stroke	(Sweden) Mikael Krantz	Västerås	
Kentab Open
1987	SWE	(United States) Gus Ulrich	206	+2	2 strokes	(Sweden) Peter Hedblom	Västerås	
1986	SWE	(Sweden) Magnus Grankvist	206	−1	Playoff	(Sweden) Mats Hallberg	Västerås	
