= Tony Edlund =

Swedish professional golfer (born 1972)

Personal information
- Nationality: Sweden
- Born: 2 June 1972 (age 54) Stockholm, Sweden

Career
- Sport: Golf
- Turned professional: 1991
- Former tours: Challenge Tour; Nordic Golf League; Swedish Golf Tour
- Professional wins: 7

Number of wins by tour
- Challenge Tour: 1
- Other: 6

Tony Edlund (born 2 June 1972) is a Swedish professional golfer and former Challenge Tour player.

== Career ==
Edlund turned professional in 1991 and joined the Challenge Tour, where he recorded his maiden professional title at the 1992 Upsala Golf International. He was runner-up at the 2001 Dutch Challenge and lost a playoff at the 2003 Finnish Challenge.

Edlund recorded six wins on the Nordic Golf League between 2005 and 2013. He was runner-up at the 1996 Volvo Finnish Open on the Swedish Golf Tour and lost the final of 2010 SM Match, after winning the event in 2009.

Edlund also made 14 starts in the European Tour, with a best finish of tied 44th at the 2001 Italian Open.

== Professional wins (7) ==
=== Challenge Tour wins (1) ===
No.	Date	Tournament	Winning score	Margin of victory	Runner-up
1	13 Sep 1992	Upsala Golf International	−7 (71-67-71=209)	2 strokes	(Norway) Per Haugsrud

Challenge Tour playoff record (0–1)

No.	Year	Tournament	Opponent	Result
1	2003	Talma Finnish Challenge	(Australia) Marcus Fraser	Lost to eagle on third extra hole

=== Nordic Golf League wins (6) ===
No.	Date	Tournament	Winning score	Margin of victory	Runner(s)-up
1	3 Sep 2005	Västerås Open	−2 (68-67-70=205)	1 stroke	(Sweden) Kalle Edberg
2	11 Jun 2006	Telia Masters	−13 (67-69-67-72=275)	3 strokes	(Sweden) Pehr Magnebrant
3	27 May 2007	PayEx Masters	−6 (72-71-67=210)	1 stroke	(Sweden) Fredrik Hammarberg, (Sweden) Robert Wahlin
4	22 Aug 2009	SM Match	2 and 1		(Sweden) Wilhelm Schauman
5	14 Aug 2010	Isaberg Open	−10 (69-71-66=206)	3 strokes	(Denmark) Rasmus Hjelm Nielsen, (Sweden) Steven Jeppesen (Sweden) Joakim Lagergren, (Sweden) Björn Åkesson
6	24 May 2013	Landskrona Masters	−13 (66-67-67=200)	2 strokes	(Sweden) Jesper Billing, (Sweden) Richard Pettersson
