= SM Match Play =

SM Match
Tournament information
- Location: Helsingborg, Sweden
- Established: 1904
- Course: Vasatorp Golf Club
- Par: 72
- Length: 6,820 yards (6,240 m)
- Tours: Challenge Tour; Nordic Golf League; Swedish Golf Tour
- Format: Stroke play and match play
- Prize fund: kr 450,000
- Month played: September

Tournament record score
- Score: 6 and 5 Mark Haastrup (2016)

Current champion
- (Norway) Sebastian Eidsæther Syr (Sweden) Sofie Bringner

Final champion
- Location in Sweden

The Swedish Match Play Championship is a golf tournament played since 1904, held for both men and women. It is the oldest and most traditional golf tournament in Sweden. The name SM is a Swedish abbreviation for Svenska Mästerskapet 'Swedish Championship'.

== History ==
From the first tournament in 1904 (for men) and 1911 (for women) until 1983, it was an amateur tournament, from 1910 open only for Swedish citizens, and the winner was the official Swedish champion. Since 1984, except 1985, the tournament has been open to both amateurs and professionals and for foreign citizens.

If a foreigner wins, the best placed Swedish player becomes Swedish champion of the year.

The men's tournament is part of the Swedish Golf Tour since 1986 and the Nordic Golf League since 1999. It featured on the Challenge Tour between 1990 and 1999. The women's tournament is part of the women's Swedish Golf Tour since 1986.

The first tournament was held 9–10 October 1904, organized by Göteborgs Golfklubb (Gothenburg Golf Club) at the newly built 6 hole Hovås Course. Only players from the home club took part, despite there were two clubs in the country, one in Stockholm also.

From 1907 to 1966, the final in the men's tournament was played over 36 holes. In 1949 and in 1950, the men's tournament began with 36 holes stroke play, were the 8 best players qualified for the match play competition. From 1932 to 1983, the final in the women's tournament was played over 36 holes.

In 2012 the format was again changed from pure match play to 36 hole stroke play followed by match play for the 32 best men and 16 best women respectively.

In 2020, the men's and women's tournaments were, for the first time, played at different venues and at different dates.

Most victories in the men's tournament are won by Elis Werkell, with six wins. Most victories in the women's tournament are won by Liv Wollin (née Forsell) with ten wins.

== Swedish champion ==
Each year a Swedish champion award is given to the highest finishing Swede at the conclusion of the tournament. The Swedish Champion in the men's category has always came from the final match, except in 1997 and 2017, when Raimo Sjöberg (1997) and Joakim Rask (2017) finished as the highest finishing Swedes without making the final.

In the women's category, Karolina Andersson in 2002, Caroline Hedwall in 2007 and Ellen Hutchinson-Kay in 2022 were crowned Swedish champions without winning the tournament.

== Winners ==
=== Men's winners ===
Year	Tour (Note: CHA − Challenge Tour; NGL − Nordic Golf League; SWE − Swedish Golf Tour.)	Winner	Score	Runner-up
SM Match
2026	NGL	(Norway) Sebastian Eidsæther Syr	3 and 1	(Sweden) Oliver Lilliedahl
2025	NGL	(Netherlands) Thom Hoetmer	4 and 3	(Sweden) Martin Eriksson
2024	NGL	(Sweden) Oliver Gillberg (2)	20 holes	(Sweden) Simon Hovdal (a)
Big Green Egg Swedish Matchplay Championship
2023	NGL	(Iceland) Axel Bóasson (2)	1 up	(Sweden) Felix Pålson
2022	NGL	(Denmark) Mathias Gladbjerg	1 up	(Sweden) Felix Jordansson
2021	NGL	(Sweden) Sebastian Petersen	3 and 2	(Sweden) Adam Blommé
SM Match
2020	SWE	(Sweden) Martin Eriksson	1 up	(Sweden) Oscar Lengdén
2019	NGL	(Sweden) Oliver Gillberg	19 holes	(Sweden) Christopher Feldborg Nielsen
2018	NGL	(Denmark) Christian Gløët	5 and 4	(Sweden) Sebastian Hansson
2017	NGL	(Iceland) Axel Bóasson	3 and 1	(Denmark) Daniel Løkke
2016	NGL	(Denmark) Mark Haastrup	6 and 5	(Sweden) Niclas Johansson
2015	NGL	(Sweden) Björn Hellgren	3 and 2	(Sweden) Anton Wejshag
2014	NGL	(Denmark) Patrick O'Neill	4 and 3	(Sweden) Christopher Feldborg Nielsen
2013	NGL	(Sweden) Jesper Kennegård	1 up	(Sweden) Joakim Lagergren
2012	NGL	(Sweden) Jesper Billing	3 and 2	(Sweden) Joakim Lagergren
2011	NGL	(Sweden) Niklas Bruzelius	2 and 1	(Sweden) Mathias Johansson
2010	NGL	(Norway) Christian Aronsen	21 holes	(Sweden) Tony Edlund
2009	NGL	(Sweden) Tony Edlund	2 and 1	(Sweden) Wilhelm Schauman
2008	NGL	(Sweden) Åke Nilsson	3 and 2	(Norway) Christian Aronsen
2007	NGL	(Sweden) Andreas Andersson	1 up	(Sweden) Niklas Bruzelius
2006	NGL	(Sweden) Andreas Ljunggren (a)	1 up	(Sweden) Jonas Wåhlstedt (a)
2005	NGL	(Sweden) Mattias Nilsson		(Sweden) David Jonsson
2004	NGL	(Sweden) Magnus A. Carlsson	3 and 2	(Sweden) Per Larsson (a)
2003	NGL	(Sweden) Andreaz Lindberg	3 and 2	(Sweden) Jonas Wåhlstedt (a)
2002	NGL	(Sweden) Fredrik Orest	4 and 2	(Sweden) Markus Westerberg
2001	NGL	(Sweden) Fredrik Widmark	19 holes	(Sweden) Yngve Nilsson
2000	NGL	(Sweden) Björn Pettersson	1 up	(Sweden) Johan Möller
Öhrlings Swedish Matchplay
1999	CHA	(Sweden) Kalle Brink	19 holes	(Sweden) Henrik Stenson
1998	CHA	(United States) Kevin Carissimi	2 and 1	(Sweden) Mattias Eliasson
1997	CHA	(United States) Gregory Garbero	2 up	(New Zealand) Elliot Boult
SM Match Play
1996	CHA	(Sweden) Adam Mednick	2 and 1	(Sweden) Freddie Jacobson
1995	CHA	(Sweden) Peter Thörn	4 and 2	(Sweden) Niclas Björnsson
1994	CHA	(Sweden) Per Nyman	1 up	(Sweden) Joakim Grönhagen
1993	CHA	(Norway) Per Haugsrud	2 and 1	(Sweden) Joakim Nilsson
1992	CHA	(Argentina) José Cantero	2 up	(Sweden) Kenny Cross
1991	CHA	(Sweden) Mathias Grönberg	19 holes	(Sweden) Mats Sterner
1990	CHA	(Republic of Ireland) Eoghan O'Connell	3 and 2	(Sweden) Per-Ulrik Johansson
1989	CHA	(Sweden) Magnus Grankvist (2)	2 and 1	(Sweden) Yngve Nilsson
SM Match Trygg-Hansa Cup
1988	SWE	(Sweden) Mikael Krantz	1 up	(Sweden) Anders Gillner
1987	SWE	(Sweden) Carl-Magnus Strömberg	1 up	(Sweden) Johan Ryström
1986	SWE	(Sweden) Magnus Grankvist	3 and 2	(Sweden) John Lindberg
Svenska Mästerskapet Match Play (Note: Until 1983 and in 1985, the SM Match Play was an amateur tournament.)
1985		(Sweden) Yngve Nilsson (a)	2 and 1	(Sweden) Mikael Krantz (a)
1984		(Sweden) Mats Lanner	2 and 1	(Sweden) Magnus Persson
1983		(Sweden) K-G Drotz	4 and 2	(Sweden) Thomas Andersson
1982		(Sweden) Björn Svedin (2)	6 and 5	(Sweden) Torbjörn Antevik
1981		(Sweden) Göran Knutsson (2)	2 and 1	(Sweden) Nils Lindeblad
1980		(Sweden) Göran Knutsson	2 and 1	(Sweden) Jan Grönkwist
1979		(Sweden) Björn Svedin	2 and 1	(Sweden) Jonas Brundin
1978		(Sweden) Mikael Sorling (2)	2 and 1	(Sweden) Krister Kinell
1977		(Sweden) Mikael Sorling	4 and 2	(Sweden) Anders Johnsson
1976		(Sweden) Bo Häggström	2 and 1	(Sweden) Jan Svensson
1975		(Sweden) Göran Lundqvist	1 up	(Sweden) Olle Dahlgren
1974		(Sweden) Jan Rube	5 and 4	(Sweden) Thomas Bergström
1973		(Sweden) Magnus Lindberg	5 and 4	(Sweden) Jan Wågnert
1972		(Sweden) Claes Jöhncke	3 and 2	(Sweden) Michael Örtegren
1971		(Sweden) Hans Hedjerson (2)	1 up	(Sweden) Jan Rube
1970		(Sweden) Hans Hedjerson	5 and 4	(Sweden) Roy Syle
1969		(Sweden) Jan Rosell (2)	5 and 3	(Sweden) Claes Lindholm
1968		(Sweden) Jan Rosell	1 up	(Sweden) Thure Holmström
1967		(Sweden) Johan Jöhncke (2)	5 and 4	(Sweden) Thure Holmström
1966		(Sweden) Thure Holmström	8 and 7	(Sweden) P. O. Johansson
1965		(Sweden) Johan Jöhncke	38 holes	(Sweden) Hans Hedjerson
1964		(Sweden) Lennart Leinborn (3)	4 and 3	(Sweden) P. O. Johansson
1963		(Sweden) Göran Göransson	2 and 1	(Sweden) Lars Hall
1962		(Sweden) P. O. Johansson	8 and 6	(Sweden) Göran Stenport
1961		(Sweden) Lennart Leinborn (2)	4 and 3	(Sweden) Bengt Möller
1960		(Sweden) Rune Karlfeldt	8 and 7	(Sweden) Nils Gustavsson
1959		(Sweden) Bengt Möller	39 holes	(Sweden) Göran Lindeblad
1958		(Sweden) Lennart Leinborn	5 and 4	(Sweden) Ola Bergqvist
1957		(Sweden) Göran Lindeblad	5 and 4	(Sweden) Rune Karlfedt
1956		(Sweden) Gustaf Adolf Bielke	10 and 8	(Sweden) Lennart Roos
1955		(Sweden) Elis Werkell (6)	3 and 2	(Sweden) Göran Lindeblad
1954		(Sweden) Gunnar Carlander	4 and 2	(Sweden) Ola Bergqvist
1953		(Sweden) Elis Werkell (5)	3 and 2	(Sweden) Bengt Möller
1952		(Sweden) Elis Werkell (4)	8 and 7	(Sweden) Carl-Reinhold Ulff
1951		(Sweden) Bengt Carlsson	1 up	(Sweden) Elis Werkell
1950		(Sweden) Elis Werkell (3)	5 and 4	(Sweden) Jan Nathorst-Westfelt
1949		(Sweden) Elis Werkell (2)	4 and 3	(Sweden) Gunnar Friberg
1948		(Sweden) Finn Sörvik (5)	37 holes	(Sweden) Elis Werkell
1947		(Sweden) Elis Werkell	3 and 1	(Sweden) Gustaf Adolf Bielke
1946		(Sweden) Finn Sörvik (4)	4 and 3	(Sweden) Edvard Brändström
1945		(Sweden) Finn Sörvik (3)	9 and 8	(Sweden) Eric Bengtsson
1944		(Sweden) Finn Sörvik (2)	3 and 2	(Sweden) Nils Odqvist
1943		(Sweden) Edvard Brändström	1 up	(Sweden) Sten Arnberg
1942		(Sweden) Erik Röhss	3 and 2	(Sweden) Nils Odqvist
1941		(Sweden) Bo Herion	3 and 2	(Sweden) Erik Runfelt
1940: No tournament
1939		(Sweden) Knut Sörvik	5 and 4	(Sweden) Hugo Runfelt
1938		(Sweden) Sune Malmström (3)	4 and 3	(Sweden) Hugo Runfelt
1937		(Sweden) Hugo Runfelt (8)	2 and 1	(Sweden) Erik Runfelt
1936		(Sweden) Sune Malmström (2)	6 and 5	(Sweden) Elof Runfelt
1935		(Sweden) Hugo Runfelt (7)	2 up	(Sweden) Stig Boström
1934		(Sweden) Erik Runfelt (6)	3 and 1	(Sweden) Gunnar Peterson
1933		(Sweden) Stig Boström	5 and 4	(Sweden) Gunnar Edstrand
1932		(Sweden) Sune Malmström	6 and 4	(Sweden) Georg Svensson
1925–1931: No tournament
1924		(Sweden) Gunnar Edstrand (2)	8 and 7	(Sweden) Erik Thorén
1923		(Sweden) Gunnar Edstrand	8 and 7	(Sweden) Elof Runfelt
1922		(Sweden) Carl Rydbeck (3)	6 and 5	(Sweden) Gunnar Edstrand
1921		(Sweden) Erik Runfelt (5)	6 and 5	(Sweden) Knut Lignell
1920		(Sweden) Carl Rydbeck (2)	6 and 5	(Sweden) Georg Pettersson
1919		(Sweden) Hans Beck-Friis (2)	1 up	(Sweden) Erik Runfelt
1918		(Sweden) Erik Runfelt (4)	9 and 7	(Sweden) Hans Beck-Friis
1917		(Sweden) Erik Runfelt (3)	2 up	(Sweden) Hans Beck-Friis
1916		(Sweden) Hans Beck-Friis	11 and 9	(Sweden) Gunnar Bauer
1915		(Sweden) Carl Rydbeck	8 and 6	(Sweden) Hans Beck-Friis
1914		(Sweden) Knut Lignell	37 holes	(Sweden) Georg Pettersson
1913		(Sweden) Erik Runfelt (2)	6 and 4	(Sweden) Carl Rydbeck
1912		(Sweden) Erik Runfelt	13 and 11	(Sweden) Carl Rydbeck
1911		(Sweden) Tor Törnsten (5)	3 and 2	(Sweden) Erik Runfelt
1910		(Sweden) Tor Törnsten (4)	37 holes	(Sweden) Erik Runfelt
1909		(Sweden) Tor Törnsten (3)	4 and 2	(Sweden) D. von Braun
1908		(Sweden) J. Harvey	9 and 8	(Sweden) Tor Törnsten
1907		(Sweden) Tor Törnsten (2)	11 and 10	(Sweden) Viktor Setterberg
1906		(Sweden) Tor Törnsten	4 and 2	(Sweden) Viktor Setterberg
1905		(Sweden) Andrew Armstrong	3 and 1	(Sweden) Viktor Setterberg
1904		(Sweden) Teodor Åkermark	8 and 6	(Sweden) Viktor Setterberg

=== Women's winners ===
Year	Winner
SM Match Play
2022	(Germany) Patricia Isabel Schmidt
2021	(Sweden) Sofie Bringner
2020	(Sweden) Linn Grant (a)
2019	(Sweden) Emma Svensson
2018	(Sweden) Lisa Pettersson
2017	(Sweden) Lynn Carlsson
2016	(Sweden) Johanna Björk
2015	(Sweden) Camilla Lennarth
2014	(Sweden) Natalie Wille
2013	(Sweden) Anjelika Hammar
2012	(Sweden) Lina Boqvist
2011	(Sweden) Cissi Wahlberg
2010	(Sweden) Lotta Wahlin
2009	(Sweden) Louise Larsson
2008	(Sweden) Anna Nordqvist (a)
2007	(Denmark) Julie Tvede
2006	(Sweden) Caroline Hedwall (a)
SM i Match Play
2005	(Sweden) Louise Stahle
2004	(Sweden) Maria Bodén
2003	(Sweden) Linda Wessberg
2002	(Finland) Rikka Hakkarainen
2001	(Sweden) Cecilia Sjöblom
2000	(Sweden) Isabelle Rosberg
Öhrlings Swedish Matchplay
1999	(Sweden) Filippa Helmersson
1998	(Sweden) Helene Koch
1997	(Sweden) Catrin Nilsmark
1996	(Sweden) Anna Berg (a)
SM Match Play
1995	(Sweden) Mia Löjdahl (a)
1994	(Sweden) Maria Hjorth (a) (2)
1993	(Sweden) Maria Hjorth (a)
1992	(Sweden) Carin Hjalmarsson
1991	(Sweden) Linda Ericsson (a)
1990	(Sweden) Jeniffer Allmark (a)
Svenska Mästerskapet Match Play
1989	(Sweden) Pia Nilsson
1988	(Sweden) Helen Alfredsson (a) (3)
SM Match Trygg-Hansa Cup
1987	(Sweden) Helen Alfredsson (a) (2)
1986	(Sweden) Helen Alfredsson (a)
Svenska Mästerskapet Match Play (Note: Until 1983 and in 1985, the SM Match Play was an amateur tournament.)
1985	(Sweden) Sofia Grönberg (a)
1984	(Sweden) Liselotte Neumann (a)
1983	(Sweden) Gisela Linnér
1982	(Sweden) Marie Wennersten (2)
1981	(Sweden) Marie Wennersten
1980	(Sweden) Liv Wollin (10)
1979	(Sweden) Hillewi Hagström
1978	(Sweden) Kärstin Ehrnlund (2)
1977	(Sweden) Kärstin Ehrnlund
1976	(Sweden) Liv Wollin (9)
1975	(Sweden) Eva Cedervall
1974	(Sweden) Monica Andersson
1973	(Sweden) Liv Wollin (8)
1972	(Sweden) Liv Wollin (7)
1971	(Sweden) Louise Wingård
1970	(Sweden) Birgit Forssman
1969	(Sweden) Liv Forsell (6)
1968	(Sweden) Liv Forsell (5)
1967	(Sweden) Liv Forsell (4)
1966	(Sweden) Liv Forsell (3)
1965	(Sweden) Cecilia Perslow
1964	(Sweden) Liv Forsell (2)
1963	(Sweden) Liv Forsell
1962	(Sweden) Ann-Marie Brynolf
1961	(Sweden) Ann-Katrin Svensson (2)
1960	(Sweden) Britt Mattsson (8)
1959	(Sweden) Marianne Bergengren (2)
1958	(Sweden) Marianne Bergengren
1957	(Sweden) Britt Mattsson (7)
1956	(Sweden) Britt Mattsson (6)
1955	(Sweden) Ann-Katrin Svensson
1954	(Sweden) Gertrud Ahlberg
1953	(Sweden) Britt Mattsson (5)
1952	(Sweden) Britt Mattsson (4)
1951	(Sweden) Britt Mattsson (3)
1950	(Sweden) Britt Mattsson (2)
1949	(Sweden) Britt Mattsson
1948	(Sweden) Nancy Runfelt (3)
1947	(Sweden) Cisela Lundberg
1946	(Sweden) Nancy Runfelt (2)
1945	(Sweden) Ann-Kersti Svensson (3)
1944	(Sweden) Maud Röhss (3)
1943	(Sweden) Ann-Marie Brynolf
1942	(Sweden) Maud Röhss (2)
1941	(Sweden) Maud Röhss
1940	No tournament
1939	(Sweden) Nancy Runfelt
1938	(Sweden) Ann-Kersti Swenson (2)
1937	(Sweden) Karin Bauer (5)
1936	(Sweden) Ellis Janzon
1935	(Sweden) Karin Bauer (4)
1934	(Sweden) Ann-Kersti Swenson
1933	(Sweden) Karin Bauer (3)
1932	(Sweden) Karin Bauer (2)
1925–31	No tournament
1924	(Sweden) Els-Brita Hammer
1923	No tournament
1922	(Sweden) Karin Bauer
1921	No tournament
1920	No tournament
1919	No tournament
1918	(Sweden) Rosa Runfelt
1917	No tournament
1916	No tournament
1915	No tournament
1914	(Sweden) Viveka Rosencrantz (2)
1913	No tournament
1912	No tournament
1911	(Sweden) Viveka Rosencrantz
1910	No tournament
1909	No tournament
1908	No tournament
1907	No tournament
1906	No tournament
1905	No tournament
1904	No tournament

== See also ==
- Swedish Junior Matchplay Championship
