= Morten Hagen =

Norwegian professional golfer

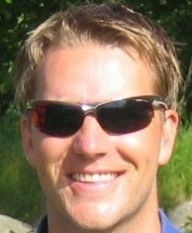

Personal information
- Nationality: Norway
- Born: 6 August 1974 (age 52)
- Height: 1.85 m (6 ft 1 in)

Career
- Sport: Golf
- Turned professional: 1997
- Former tour: Challenge Tour
- Professional wins: 7

Number of wins by tour
- Challenge Tour: 1

Achievements and awards
- Nordic Golf League Order of Merit winner: 2005

Morten Hagen (born 6 August 1974) is a Norwegian professional golfer. His home club is Vestfold Golfklubb.

== Career ==
Hagen has spent most of his career playing in events on the various Scandinavian tours, where he has collected several victories and finished top of the Nordic League Ranking in 2005. He has also played many events over the course of six seasons on the second tier Challenge Tour, winning the Telia Challenge Waxholm in 2005. He has made just two appearances on the European Tour, the first in the 2005 Abama Open de Canarias and the second in 2006 at the OSIM Singapore Masters.

== Amateur wins ==
- 1991 Norwegian Junior Championship
- 1993 Norwegian Amateur Open Championship
- 1994 Norwegian Amateur Youths Championship

== Professional wins (7) ==
=== Challenge Tour wins (1) ===
No.	Date	Tournament	Winning score	Margin of victory	Runner-up
1	11 Sep 2005	Telia Challenge Waxholm	−12 (72-68-72-68=280)	Playoff	(Sweden) Christian Nilsson

Challenge Tour playoff record (1–0)

No.	Year	Tournament	Opponent	Result
1	2005	Telia Challenge Waxholm	(Sweden) Christian Nilsson	Won with birdie on fourth extra hole

=== Nordic Golf League wins (4) ===
No.	Date	Tournament	Winning score	Margin of victory	Runner(s)-up
1	15 Aug 1999	PGA Braathens Championship	−8 (69-67-72=208)	Playoff	(Sweden) Johan Edfors
2	30 May 2004	Fujitsu Siemens Open	−8 (68-70-70=208)	1 stroke	(Norway) Jan-Are Larsen, (Sweden) Christian Nilsson
3	6 May 2005	Eurocard Open	−7 (70-73-67=210)	2 strokes	(Finland) Panu Kylliäinen
4	26 Aug 2005	Swedish International	−8 (71-69-71=211)	3 strokes	(Sweden) Andreas Ljunggren (a)

=== Swedish Golf Tour wins (1) ===
No.	Date	Tournament	Winning score	Margin of victory	Runner-up
1	20 Jun 1998	Onsöy Open	−7 (70-67-72=209)	5 strokes	(Sweden) Ville Lemon

=== Other wins (1) ===
- 1997 Norwegian PGA Championship

== Team appearances ==
Amateur

- Eisenhower Trophy (representing Norway): 1994, 1996
- European Amateur Team Championship (representing Norway): 1995

Professional

- World Cup (representing Norway): 1997
