= Christian Nilsson (golfer) =

Swedish professional golfer

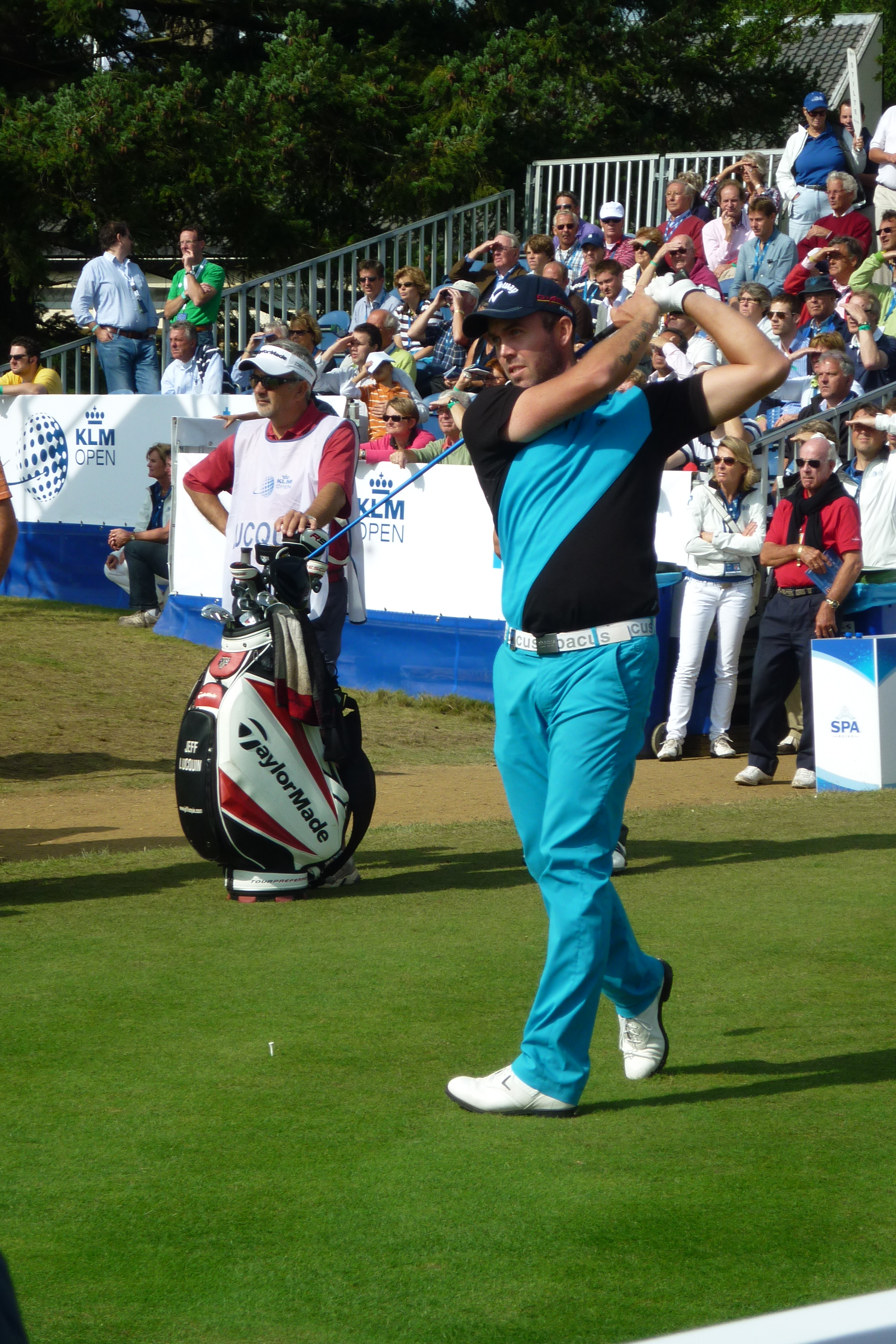
- Nilsson at the 2010 KLM Open

Personal information
- Full name: Christian Lars Nilsson
- Nationality: Sweden
- Born: 25 May 1979 (age 47) Karlstad, Sweden
- Height: 1.84 m (6 ft 0 in)
- Weight: 85 kg (187 lb; 13.4 st)
- Spouse: Johanna Nilsson (m. 2009)
- Children: 1

Career
- Sport: Golf
- Turned professional: 1999
- Former tour: European Tour
- Professional wins: 9

Number of wins by tour
- European Tour: 1
- Challenge Tour: 1
- Other: 8

Christian Lars Nilsson (born 25 May 1979) is a Swedish former professional golfer.

== Professional career ==
Nilsson was born in Karlstad, Sweden. He turned professional in 1999 with a plus 3 handicap. Nilsson played on the Challenge Tour full-time since 2004, playing few events before then. His first event on the European Tour was the 2005 Open Championship where he missed the cut. His first full season on the European Tour was 2006, and his second in 2007. In 2008 he played on both the Challenge and European Tours with his best finish a runner-up to David Dixon at the Saint-Omer Open, but he did not break through until 2009 at the same event. At the 2009 Saint-Omer Open in June, a week opposite the U.S. Open, Nilsson won his first European Tour event by 6 strokes over Portugal's José-Filipe Lima. The win was Nilsson's first professional win on a recognized major golf tour.

After a disappointing season in 2012 where he finished 149th in the Race to Dubai, Nilsson announced that he would be retiring from professional golf to focus more on his family. He began working as an instructing professional at Karlstad Golf Club.

In 2017 he came back to competitive golf, playing on the Nordic Golf League, the Swedish Golf Tour and the Swedish mini tour Future Series. In 2017 and 2018 he won four times on the Future Series in Sweden.

== Professional wins (9) ==
=== European Tour wins (1) ===
| No. | Date | Tournament | Winning score | Margin of victory | Runner-up |
|---|---|---|---|---|---|
| 1 | 21 Jun 2009 | Saint-Omer Open^{1} | −13 (68-69-65-69=271) | 6 strokes | (Portugal) José-Filipe Lima |

^{1}Dual-ranking event with the Challenge Tour

=== Challenge Tour wins (1) ===
| No. | Date | Tournament | Winning score | Margin of victory | Runner-up |
|---|---|---|---|---|---|
| 1 | 21 Jun 2009 | Saint-Omer Open^{1} | −13 (68-69-65-69=271) | 6 strokes | (Portugal) José-Filipe Lima |

^{1}Dual-ranking event with the European Tour

Challenge Tour playoff record (0–1)

| No. | Year | Tournament | Opponent | Result |
|---|---|---|---|---|
| 1 | 2005 | Telia Challenge Waxholm | (Norway) Morten Hagen | Lost to birdie on fourth extra hole |

=== Nordic Golf League wins (3) ===
| No. | Date | Tournament | Winning score | Margin of victory | Runner-up |
|---|---|---|---|---|---|
| 1 | 25 May 2002 | Telehuset Larvik Open | −13 (69-69-65=203) | 9 strokes | (Norway) Knut-Alexander Schiager |
| 2 | 3 Sep 2005 | Hydro-Texaco Open | −6 (69-69=138) | 4 strokes | (Norway) Morten Hagen |
| 3 | 9 Oct 2005 | Öresund Masters | −9 (72-69-69=210) | 2 strokes | (Sweden) Robert Johansén |

=== Other wins (5) ===
- 2000 Vattenfall Berga Open (Swedish Mini-Tour)
- 2017 Kumla Open by Malmbergs Elektriska AB, Bråviken Open, OVAKO Hagge Open (all Swedish minitour Future Series)
- 2018 Hårga Open (Swedish minitour Future Series)

== Team appearances ==
Amateur

- European Boys' Team Championship (representing Sweden): 1996, 1997
- Jacques Léglise Trophy (representing the Continent of Europe): 1996 (winners)
- European Youths' Team Championship (representing Sweden): 1998
- Eisenhower Trophy (representing Sweden): 1998, 2002

== See also ==
- 2005 European Tour Qualifying School graduates
- 2008 Challenge Tour graduates
