= Nordic Golf League =

Professional golf tour

- Current season, competition or edition: 2026 Nordic Golf League
- Sport: Golf
- Founded: 1999
- First season: 1999
- Countries: Based in the Nordic countries (Note: Schedules have also included events in Estonia, Germany, Latvia, Lithuania, Poland, Portugal, Russia and Spain.)
- Most titles: Tournament wins: (Sweden) Jens Dantorp (8) (Sweden) Åke Nilsson (8) (Finland) Tapio Pulkkanen (8) (Sweden) Joakim Rask (8)
- Related competitions: Danish Golf Tour; Finnish Tour; Norwegian Golf Tour; Swedish Golf Tour

The Nordic Golf League is one of the third-tier men's professional golf tours, recognised by the European Tour, also known as the Satellite Tours. The top five players on the Order of Merit at the end of each season earn status to play on the second tier Challenge Tour for the following season. Should a player in the top five earn Challenge Tour status by a different method (European Tour Q School, three-win season, top 70 in Challenge Tour rankings), the next non-exempt player is promoted.

The tour is based in Scandinavia, and incorporates tournaments from the national tours of Denmark, Finland, and Sweden. In years past, the Nordic Golf League incorporated tournaments from the now defunct Norwegian Golf Tour.

Since July 2015, Nordic Golf League tournaments have carried Official World Golf Ranking points.

Nordic Golf League competitors who went on to win on the European Tour include Lucas Bjerregaard, Alexander Björk, Kristoffer Broberg, Rikard Karlberg, Mikko Korhonen, Morten Ørum Madsen, Christian Nilsson, and Thorbjørn Olesen.

== Order of Merit winners ==
Year	Winner	Points
2026	(Sweden) David Lundgren	76,518
2025	(Sweden) Adam Wallin	76,045
2024	(Sweden) Jesper Sandborg	54,099
2023	(Sweden) Björn Åkesson	61,884
2022	(Denmark) John Axelsen	53,303
2021	(Sweden) Christopher Feldborg Nielsen	43,578
2020	(Sweden) Mikael Lindberg	32,473
2019	(Denmark) Niklas Nørgaard	47,891
2018	(Norway) Aksel Olsen	48,181
2017	(Iceland) Axel Bóasson	45,260
2016	(Denmark) Mark Haastrup	54,457
2015	(Finland) Tapio Pulkkanen	62,652
2014	(Sweden) Jacob Glennemo	64,988
2013	(Sweden) Jesper Kennegård	46,591
2012	(Denmark) Lucas Bjerregaard	52,260
2011	(Sweden) Jens Dantorp	61,167
2010	(Sweden) Wilhelm Schauman	30,869
2009	(Denmark) Lasse Jensen	32,396
2008	(Sweden) Petter Bocian	24,510
2007	(Sweden) Rikard Karlberg	25,005
2006	(Sweden) Pontus Ericsson	2,207
2005	(Norway) Morten Hagen	2,509
2004	(Sweden) Peter Malmgren	1,974
2003	(Norway) Øyvind Rojahn	1,820
2002	(Sweden) Joakim Kristiansson	1,990
2001	(Denmark) Mads Vibe-Hastrup	2,159
2000	(Norway) Morten Orveland	2,147
1999	(Sweden) Patrik Gottfridson	28,516

== See also ==
- Danish Golf Tour
- Finnish Tour
- Norwegian Golf Tour
- Swedish Golf Tour
