= 2020 Swedish Golf Tour =

Golf tour season

2020 Swedish Golf Tour season
- Duration: 23 February 2020 – 9 October 2020
- Number of official events: 12 (Note: A further five tournaments were scheduled but were either cancelled or postponed.)
- Most wins: (Sweden) Ludvig Åberg (2)
- Order of Merit: (Sweden) Mikael Lindberg

The 2020 Swedish Golf Tour, titled as the 2020 MoreGolf Mastercard Tour for sponsorship reasons, was the 37th season of the Swedish Golf Tour, the main professional golf tour in Sweden since it was formed in 1984, with most tournaments being incorporated into the Nordic Golf League since 1999.

== MoreGolf Mastercard title sponsorship ==
In March, it was announced that the tour had signed a title sponsorship agreement with MoreGolf Mastercard, being renamed as the MoreGolf Mastercard Tour.

== In-season changes ==
The 2020 schedule initially consisted of 26 tournaments, 16 of them, in Sweden, Norway, Finland and Spain, included in the 2020 schedule. After a four-month break and rescheduling, due to the COVID-19 pandemic, the 2020 SGT schedule included 12 tournaments, two of them played in Spain in February and March, the remaining 10 in Sweden. Due to travel restrictions, four tournaments was taken away from the 2020 Nordic Golf League Order of Merit Golfbox Road to Europe, but was still counted on the 2020 MoreGolf Mastercard Tour and still earned OWGR points.

== Schedule ==
The following table lists official events during the 2020 season.

Date	Tournament	Location	Purse (SKr)	Winner (Note: The number in brackets after each winner's name is the number of Swedish Golf Tour events they had won up to and including that tournament. As most Swedish Golf Tour events are incorporated into the Nordic Golf League schedule, details of these wins are displayed there instead.)	Main tour (Note: NGL − Nordic Golf League.)
25 Feb	Lumine Hills Open	Spain	550,000	(Denmark) Marcus Helligkilde	NGL
1 Mar	Lumine Lakes Open	Spain	550,000	(Sweden) Mikael Lindberg	NGL
~~30 Apr~~	Elisefarm Open	Skåne	–	Cancelled	NGL
~~18 Jun~~	Gamle Fredrikstad Open	Norway	–	Postponed	NGL
~~26 Jun~~	Sand Golf Club Open	Småland	–	Cancelled	NGL
4 Jul	Katrineholm Open	Södermanland	430,000	(Sweden) Ludvig Åberg (a) (1)	
~~9 Jul~~	Kongsvinger Open	Norway	–	Cancelled	NGL
16 Jul	Barsebäck Resort Masters	Skåne	350,000	(Sweden) Ludvig Åberg (a) (2)	
24 Jul	Stockholm Trophy	Södermanland	380,000	(Sweden) Mikael Lindberg (1)	
28 Jul	SM Match	Uppland	350,000	(Sweden) Martin Eriksson (1)	
1 Aug	PGA Championship Bråviken Open	Östergötland	500,000	(Sweden) Björn Hellgren (3)	
14 Aug	Landeryd Masters	Östergötland	400,000	(Sweden) Robin Petersson	NGL
27 Aug	V Sport Golf Challenge	Skåne	350,000	(Sweden) Joakim Wikström	NGL
~~29 Aug~~	Timberwise Finnish Open	Finland	–	Cancelled	NGL
4 Sep; ~~16 May~~	TanumStrand Fjällbacka Open	Bohuslän	420,000	(Sweden) Pelle Edberg	NGL
24 Sep	Visby Open	Gotland	380,000	(Sweden) Joakim Wikström	NGL
9 Oct	Lindbytvätten Tour Final	Öland	400,000	(Denmark) Lasse Jensen	NGL

== Order of Merit ==
The Order of Merit was titled as the MoreGolf Mastercard Tour Ranking and was based on tournament results during the season, calculated using a points-based system.

Position	Player	Points
1	(Sweden) Mikael Lindberg	434,903
2	(Denmark) Marcus Helligkilde	242,608
3	(Sweden) Joakim Wikström	200,503
4	(Sweden) Ludvig Åberg (a)	172,740
5	(Sweden) Björn Hellgren	146,980

== See also ==
- 2020 Danish Golf Tour
- 2020 Swedish Golf Tour (women)
