= 2011 Swedish Golf Tour =

Golf tour season

2011 Swedish Golf Tour season
- Duration: 29 April 2011 – 2 October 2011
- Number of official events: 14
- Order of Merit: (Sweden) Jens Dantorp

The 2011 Swedish Golf Tour, titled as the 2011 Nordea Tour for sponsorship reasons, was the 28th season of the Swedish Golf Tour, the main professional golf tour in Sweden since it was formed in 1984, with most tournaments being incorporated into the Nordic Golf League since 1999.

== Schedule ==
The following table lists official events during the 2011 season.

Date	Tournament	Location	Purse (SKr)	Winner (Note: The number in brackets after each winner's name is the number of Swedish Golf Tour events they had won up to and including that tournament. As most Swedish Golf Tour events are incorporated into the Nordic Golf League schedule, details of these wins are displayed there instead.)	Main tour (Note: NGL − Nordic Golf League.)
1 May	PEAB PGA Grand Opening	Skåne	500,000	(Sweden) Steven Jeppesen	NGL
28 May	PayEx Invitational	Gotland	400,000	(Sweden) Victor Almström	NGL
4 Jun	Söderby Masters	Uppland	450,000	(Sweden) Mathias Johansson	NGL
11 Jun	Sturup Park Masters	Skåne	450,000	(Sweden) Jens Dantorp	NGL
23 Jun	Nordea Open	Norway	350,000	(Sweden) Mattias Eliasson	NGL
8 Jul	Katrineholm Open	Södermanland	300,000	(Sweden) Joakim Rask	NGL
31 Jul	Gant Open	Finland	€40,000	(Finland) Toni Karjalainen	NGL
13 Aug	Isaberg Open	Småland	400,000	(Sweden) Johan Wahlqvist	NGL
18 Aug	SM Match	Uppland	250,000	(Sweden) Niklas Bruzelius	NGL
21 Aug	Gefle Open	Gästrikland	400,000	(Sweden) Steven Jeppesen	NGL
28 Aug	Landskrona Masters	Skåne	450,000	(Sweden) Andreas Högberg	NGL
9 Sep	Bravo Tours Open	Denmark	DKr 300,000	(Sweden) Jens Dantorp	NGL
17 Sep	Telenor Masters	Småland	400,000	(Sweden) Gustav Adell	NGL
2 Oct	Nordea Tour Championship	Halland	450,000	(Sweden) Felix Fihn	NGL

== Order of Merit ==
The Order of Merit was titled as the Nordea Tour Ranking and was based on tournament results during the season, calculated using a points-based system.

Position	Player	Points
1	(Sweden) Jens Dantorp	316,840
2	(Sweden) Steven Jeppesen	228,113
3	(Sweden) Kristoffer Broberg	210,473
4	(Sweden) Joakim Rask	192,709
5	(Sweden) Felix Fihn	174,131

== See also ==
- 2011 Danish Golf Tour
- 2011 Finnish Tour
- 2011 Swedish Golf Tour (women)
