= 2020 Nordic Golf League =

Golf tour season

2020 Nordic Golf League season
- Duration: 23 February 2020 – 9 October 2020
- Number of official events: 13 (Note: A further eight tournaments were scheduled but were either cancelled or postponed.)
- Most wins: (Sweden) Mikael Lindberg (3)
- Order of Merit: (Sweden) Mikael Lindberg

The 2020 Nordic Golf League is the 22nd season of the Nordic Golf League, a third-tier tour recognised by the European Tour.

== In-season changes ==
The season started with four events in Spain, and was later suspended in March 2020 due to the COVID-19 pandemic. After the hiatus, the schedule was subject to change and several tournaments were postponed, cancelled or due to travel restrictions, became unofficial events for Order of Merit ranking purposed.

The tour announced in July that only the top three players (rather than the traditional five) on the final Order of Merit would receive Challenge Tour status for the 2021 season.

== Schedule ==
The following table lists official events during the 2020 season.

Date	Tournament	Host country	Purse	Winner (Note: The number in brackets after each winner's name is the number of Nordic Golf League events they had won up to and including that tournament. It is rare for someone to accumulate many wins on the Nordic Golf League as success at this level usually leads to promotion to the Challenge Tour.)	OWGR points
25 Feb	Lumine Hills Open	Spain	SKr 550,000	(Denmark) Marcus Helligkilde (2)	4
1 Mar	Lumine Lakes Open	Spain	SKr 550,000	(Sweden) Mikael Lindberg (3)	4
7 Mar	ECCO Tour Spanish Masters	Spain	DKr 375,000	(Denmark) Jeppe Huldahl (2)	4
11 Mar	PGA Catalunya Resort Championship	Spain	DKr 375,000	(Denmark) Jeppe Huldahl (3)	4
~~30 Apr~~	Elisefarm Open	Sweden	–	Cancelled	–
~~8 May~~	Jyske Bank Made in Denmark Qualifier	Denmark	–	Postponed	–
~~5 Jun~~	The 12 Twelve - Players Charity	Denmark	–	Postponed	–
~~10 Jun~~	Samsø Pro-Am Classic	Denmark	–	Postponed	–
~~18 Jun~~	Gamle Fredrikstad Open	Norway	–	Postponed	–
~~26 Jun~~	Sand Golf Club Open	Sweden	–	Cancelled	–
~~9 Jul~~	Kongsvinger Open	Norway	–	Cancelled	–
7 Aug	Thisted Forsikring Championship	Denmark	€35,000	(Sweden) Mikael Lindberg (4)	4
14 Aug	Landeryd Masters	Sweden	SKr 400,000	(Sweden) Robin Petersson (1)	4
21 Aug	Esbjerg Open	Denmark	€35,000	(Denmark) Niklas Nørgaard (3)	4
27 Aug	V Sport Golf Challenge	Sweden	SKr 350,000	(Sweden) Joakim Wikström (2)	4
~~29 Aug~~	Timberwise Finnish Open	Finland	–	Cancelled	–
4 Sep; ~~16 May~~	TanumStrand Fjällbacka Open	Sweden	SKr 420,000	(Sweden) Pelle Edberg (5)	4
18 Sep	Ledreborg Palace Golf Masters	Denmark	€30,000	(Sweden) Mikael Lindberg (5)	4
24 Sep	Visby Open	Sweden	SKr 380,000	(Sweden) Joakim Wikström (3)	4
4 Oct	Race to HimmerLand	Denmark	€40,000	(Sweden) Jesper Svensson (1)	4
9 Oct	Lindbytvätten Tour Final	Sweden	SKr 400,000	(Denmark) Lasse Jensen (5)	4

=== Unofficial events ===
The following events were sanctioned by the Nordic Golf League, but did not carry official money, nor were wins official.

Date	Tournament	Host country	Purse	Winner	OWGR points
10 Jun; ~~24 Apr~~	Bravo Tours Open	Denmark	€25,000	(Denmark) Emily Kristine Pedersen	n/a
26 Jun	Jyske Bank Danish PGA Championship	Denmark	DKr 300,000	(Denmark) Marcus Helligkilde	n/a
4 Jul	Katrineholm Open	Sweden	SKr 430,000	(Sweden) Ludvig Åberg (a)	7
16 Jul	Barsebäck Resort Masters	Sweden	SKr 350,000	(Sweden) Ludvig Åberg (a)	4
24 Jul	Stockholm Trophy	Sweden	SKr 380,000	(Sweden) Mikael Lindberg	4
28 Jul; ~~30 May~~	SM Match	Sweden	SKr 350,000	(Sweden) Martin Eriksson	4
1 Aug; ~~21 May~~	PGA Championship Bråviken Open	Sweden	SKr 500,000	(Sweden) Björn Hellgren	4

== Order of Merit ==
The Order of Merit was titled as the GolfBox Road to Europe and was based on tournament results during the season, calculated using a points-based system. The top three players on the Order of Merit earned status to play on the 2021 Challenge Tour.

Position	Player	Points	Status earned
1	(Sweden) Mikael Lindberg	32,473	Promoted to Challenge Tour
2	(Denmark) Marcus Helligkilde	27,743	Promoted to Challenge Tour
3	(Denmark) Jeppe Huldahl	23,731	Promoted to Challenge Tour
4	(Finland) Lauri Ruuska	22,100	
5	(Sweden) Joakim Wikström	21,167	
6	(Norway) Jarand Ekeland Arnøy	16,004	
7	(Denmark) Lasse Jensen	15,034	
8	(Sweden) Martin Eriksson	11,751	
9	(Sweden) Robin Petersson	10,948	
10	(Sweden) Per Längfors	10,880	

== See also ==
- 2020 Danish Golf Tour
- 2020 Swedish Golf Tour
