= 2009 Swedish Golf Tour =

Golf tour season

2009 Swedish Golf Tour season
- Duration: 29 April 2009 – 10 October 2009
- Number of official events: 15
- Order of Merit: (Sweden) Joakim Rask

The 2009 Swedish Golf Tour, titled as the 2009 SAS Masters Tour for sponsorship reasons, was the 26th season of the Swedish Golf Tour, the main professional golf tour in Sweden since it was formed in 1984, with most tournaments being incorporated into the Nordic Golf League since 1999.

== Schedule ==
The following table lists official events during the 2009 season.

Date	Tournament	Location	Purse (SKr)	Winner (Note: The number in brackets after each winner's name is the number of Swedish Golf Tour events they had won up to and including that tournament. As most Swedish Golf Tour events are incorporated into the Nordic Golf League schedule, details of these wins are displayed there instead.)	Main tour (Note: NGL − Nordic Golf League.)
1 May	St Ibb Open	Skåne	300,000	(Sweden) Jens Dantorp	NGL
16 May	Sturup Park Masters	Skåne	350,000	(Sweden) Wilhelm Schauman	NGL
23 May	Willis Masters	Denmark	DKr 300,000	(Norway) Peter Kaensche	NGL
30 May	Fredrik Jacobson Masters	Halland	225,000	(Sweden) Jonas Enander-Hedin	NGL
6 Jun	Söderby Masters	Uppland	425,000	(Sweden) Joakim Rask	NGL
13 Jun	Salem Becker Open	Södermanland	200,000	(Sweden) Andreas Hedlund	NGL
12 Jul	Gant Open	Finland	550,000	(Sweden) Anders Sjöstrand	NGL
2 Aug	Capitals Masters	Lithuania	€20,000	(Denmark) Lasse Jensen	NGL
15 Aug	Pensum Invitational	Ångermanland	300,000	(Sweden) Fredrik Hammarberg	NGL
22 Aug	SM Match	Närke	200,000	(Sweden) Tony Edlund	NGL
30 Aug	Landskrona Masters	Skåne	400,000	(Denmark) Lasse Jensen	NGL
12 Sep	Kinnaborg Open	Västergötland	200,000	(Sweden) Niklas Bruzelius	NGL
19 Sep	Västerås Mälarstaden Open	Västmanland	200,000	(Sweden) Mårten Milling (a)	NGL
26 Sep	PGA of Sweden National Open	Skåne	275,000	(Sweden) Alexander Björk	NGL
10 Oct	Volkswagen Kallfors Open	Södermanland	250,000	(Sweden) Wilhelm Schauman	NGL

== Order of Merit ==
The Order of Merit was based on tournament results during the season, calculated using a points-based system.

Position	Player	Points
1	(Sweden) Joakim Rask	210,062
2	(Sweden) Anders Sjöstrand	203,072
3	(Denmark) Lasse Jensen	178,154
4	(Sweden) Wilhelm Schauman	157,373
5	(Sweden) Niklas Bruzelius	137,639

== See also ==
- 2009 Danish Golf Tour
- 2009 Swedish Golf Tour (women)
