= 2021 Swedish Golf Tour =

Golf tour season

2021 Swedish Golf Tour season
- Duration: 18 February 2021 – 15 October 2021
- Number of official events: 14 (Note: A further three tournaments were scheduled but were cancelled.)
- Order of Merit: (Sweden) Adam Blommé

The 2021 Swedish Golf Tour, titled as the 2021 MoreGolf Mastercard Tour for sponsorship reasons, was the 38th season of the Swedish Golf Tour, the main professional golf tour in Sweden since it was formed in 1984, with most tournaments being incorporated into the Nordic Golf League since 1999.

== In-season changes ==
The 2021 season initially consisted of 18 tournaments. Two tournaments, the Winter Series, planned to be played in Spain 18–28 February was cancelled due to the COVID-19 pandemic. The Gamle Fredrikstad Open was also planned to be played in Norway, from 25–27 May, but was also cancelled due to the pandemic. 14 scheduled tournaments remained, to take place from May to October; two in Finland, one in Norway and 11 in Sweden.

== Schedule ==
The following table lists official events during the 2021 season.

Date	Tournament	Location	Purse (SKr)	Winner (Note: The number in brackets after each winner's name is the number of Swedish Golf Tour events they had won up to and including that tournament. As most Swedish Golf Tour events are incorporated into the Nordic Golf League schedule, details of these wins are displayed there instead.)	Main tour (Note: NGL − Nordic Golf League.)
~~22 Feb~~	Lumine Hills Open	Spain	–	Cancelled	NGL
~~28 Feb~~	Lumine Lakes Open	Spain	–	Cancelled	NGL
6 May	Lindbytvätten Grand Opening	Öland	420,000	(Sweden) Hampus Bergman	NGL
22 May	TanumStrand Fjällbacka Open	Bohuslän	350,000	(Sweden) Robert S. Karlsson	NGL
~~27 May~~	Gamle Fredrikstad Open	Norway	–	Cancelled	
4 Jun	Stockholm Trophy	Södermanland	420,000	(Sweden) Jesper Kennegård	NGL
24 Jun	Halmstad Challenge	Halland	400,000	(Denmark) Nicolai Nøhr Madsen	NGL
2 Jul	Junet Open	Småland	430,000	(Denmark) Lasse Jensen	NGL
10 Jul	Live It Katrineholm Open	Södermanland	430,000	(Sweden) Hannes Rönneblad	NGL
24 Jul	Audi Finnish PGA Golf Tour Championship	Finland	€40,000	(Finland) Niclas Hellberg	NGL
31 Jul	Göteborg Open	Västergötland	420,000	(Sweden) Jonathan Ågren	NGL
16 Aug	Bråviken Open	Östergötland	400,000	(Sweden) Adam Eineving	NGL
21 Aug	PGA Championship Landeryd Masters	Östergötland	600,000	(Sweden) Christopher Feldborg Nielsen	NGL
4 Sep	Timberwise Finnish Open	Finland	€55,000	(Sweden) Christopher Feldborg Nielsen	NGL
24 Sep	Big Green Egg Swedish Matchplay Championship	Västergötland	430,000	(Sweden) Sebastian Petersen	NGL
30 Sep	Visby Open	Gotland	400,000	(Norway) Jarand Ekeland Arnøy	NGL
15 Oct	MoreGolf Mastercard Tour Final	Skåne	500,000	(Sweden) Sebastian Petersen	NGL

== Order of Merit ==
The Order of Merit was titled as the MoreGolf Mastercard Tour Ranking and was based on tournament results during the season, calculated using a points-based system.

Position	Player	Points
1	(Sweden) Adam Blommé	217,371
2	(Sweden) Christopher Feldborg Nielsen	193,373
3	(Sweden) Sebastian Petersen	187,688
4	(Sweden) Björn Åkesson	182,600
5	(Denmark) Lasse Jensen	180,023

== See also ==
- 2021 Danish Golf Tour
- 2021 Swedish Golf Tour (women)
