= 2001 EPD Tour =

Golf tour season

2001 EPD Tour season
- Duration: 23 April 2001 – 13 September 2001
- Number of official events: 14
- Most wins: (Germany) Christoph Günther (3)
- Order of Merit: (Saint Lucia) Regis Gustave

The 2001 EPD Tour was the fifth season of the EPD Tour, a third-tier tour recognised by the European Tour.

== Schedule ==
The following table lists official events during the 2001 season.

Date	Tournament	Host country	Purse (€)	Winner (Note: The number in brackets after each winner's name is the number of EPD Tour events they had won up to and including that tournament. It is rare for someone to accumulate many wins on the EPD Tour as success at this level usually leads to promotion to the Challenge Tour.)
24 Apr	Bad Windsheim Classic	Germany	12,500	(Germany) Patrick Platz (2)
30 Apr	Gleidingen Classic	Germany	10,000	(Sweden) Fredrick Månsson (1)
9 May	Jakobsberg Classic	Germany	12,500	(Germany) Patrick Platz (3)
13 May	Gruyere Classic	Switzerland	12,500	(Germany) Uwe Tappertzhofen (1)
29 May	Schärding Classic	Austria	12,500	(Germany) Christoph Günther (1)
6 Jun	Schloss Westerholt Classic	Germany	10,000	(England) David Geall (1)
12 Jun	Gut Dueneburg Classic	Germany	10,000	(Saint Lucia) Regis Gustave (1)
18 Jun	Königsfeld Classic	Germany	15,000	(Germany) Christoph Günther (2)
4 Jul	Spessart Classic	Germany	12,500	(Germany) Christoph Günther (3)
24 Jul	Sybrook Classic	Netherlands	12,500	(Germany) Christian Arenz (2)
7 Aug	Kassel Classic	Germany	12,500	(Scotland) Stephen Walker (1)
14 Aug	Lich Classic	Germany	15,000	(England) Phil Gresswell (1)
21 Aug	Reichswald Classic	Germany	12,500	(England) David Geall (2)
13 Sep	EPD Tour Championship	Germany	25,000	(Germany) Jochen Lupprian (1)

== Order of Merit ==
The Order of Merit was based on prize money won during the season, calculated in Euros. The top four players on the Order of Merit earned status to play on the 2002 Challenge Tour.

Position	Player	Prize money (€)	Status earned
1	(Saint Lucia) Regis Gustave	8,973	Promoted to Challenge Tour
2	(Germany) Christoph Günther	8,711	Promoted to Challenge Tour
3	(England) David Geall	8,610	Promoted to Challenge Tour
4	(Germany) Patrick Platz	8,014	Promoted to Challenge Tour
5	(Scotland) Euan McIntosh	7,255	
6	(Belgium) Arnaud Langenaeken	5,740	
7	(Germany) Christian Arenz	5,616	
8	(South Africa) Glen Hutcheson	5,455	
9	(Scotland) Stuart Bannerman	4,763	
10	(Germany) Jochen Lupprian	4,670	
