= 2010 Nordic Golf League =

Golf tour season

2010 Nordic Golf League season
- Duration: 7 March 2010 – 16 October 2010
- Number of official events: 30
- Most wins: (Sweden) Wilhelm Schauman (3)
- Order of Merit: (Sweden) Wilhelm Schauman

The 2010 Nordic Golf League was the 12th season of the Nordic Golf League, a third-tier tour recognised by the European Tour.

== Schedule ==
The following table lists official events during the 2010 season.

Date	Tournament	Host country	Purse	Winner (Note: The number in brackets after each winner's name is the number of Nordic Golf League events they had won up to and including that tournament. It is rare for someone to accumulate many wins on the Nordic Golf League as success at this level usually leads to promotion to the Challenge Tour.)	Other tours (Note: EPD − EPD Tour.)
9 Mar	La Manga Masters I	Spain	€30,000	(Denmark) Thomas Nørret (3)	
13 Mar	La Manga Masters II	Spain	€30,000	(Norway) Jan-Are Larsen (2)	
17 Mar	Titleist Trophy	Spain	€50,000	(Sweden) Pontus Ericsson (2)	
13 May	JELD-WEN Masters	Denmark	DKr 275,000	(Denmark) Thomas Nørret (4)	
22 May	Willis Masters	Denmark	DKr 300,000	(Norway) Marius Thorp (4)	
29 May	Fredrik Jacobson Masters	Sweden	SKr 250,000	(Sweden) Wilhelm Schauman (3)	
30 May	Finnish Tour Opening	Finland	€15,000	(Finland) Joonas Granberg (2)	
5 Jun	Söderby Masters	Sweden	SKr 425,000	(Sweden) Oskar Bergman (1)	
12 Jun	Danfoss Masters	Denmark	DKr 275,000	(Denmark) Rasmus Hjelm Nielsen (1)	
12 Jun	Sturup Park Masters	Sweden	SKr 450,000	(Sweden) Adrian Axelson (1)	
18 Jun	Golf Experten Open	Denmark	DKr 250,000	(Denmark) Joachim B. Hansen (a) (1)	
19 Jun	Finnish Tour 2	Finland	€15,000	(Finland) Tuomas Tuovinen (2)	
24 Jun	Nordea Masters	Norway	SKr 300,000	(Sweden) Marcus Palm (2)	
30 Jun	Unibake Masters	Denmark	DKr 300,000	(Sweden) Gustav Adell (1)	
3 Jul	Finnish Tour 3	Finland	€15,000	(Finland) Jani Christoffer Perttilä (1)	
11 Jul	Gant Open	Finland	€40,000	(Sweden) Wilhelm Schauman (4)	
30 Jul	St Ibb Open	Sweden	SKr 300,000	(Sweden) Victor Almström (1)	
31 Jul	Green Eagle Classic	Germany	€30,000	(Sweden) Gustav Adell (2)	EPD
7 Aug	Gefle Open	Sweden	SKr 350,000	(Sweden) Björn Åkesson (1)	
14 Aug	Isaberg Open	Sweden	SKr 300,000	(Sweden) Tony Edlund (5)	
21 Aug	SM Match	Sweden	SKr 250,000	(Norway) Christian Aronsen (4)	
29 Aug	Landskrona Masters	Sweden	SKr 450,000	(Sweden) Joakim Lagergren (1)	
3 Sep	Peltomäki Golf Open	Finland	€15,000	(Finland) Jani Christoffer Perttilä (2)	
8 Sep	Samsø Masters	Denmark	DKr 300,000	(Sweden) David Palm (1)	
11 Sep	Finnish Tour 6	Finland	€15,000	(Finland) Tapio Pulkkanen (a) (2)	
18 Sep	PEAB PGA Open	Sweden	SKr 400,000	(Sweden) Magnus Persson Atlevi (2)	
19 Sep	Finnish Tour Final	Finland	€15,000	(Finland) Thomas Sundström (7)	
25 Sep	Krone Golf Tours Open	Denmark	DKr 250,000	(Sweden) Wilhelm Schauman (5)	
2 Oct	Helsingborg Golf Open	Sweden	SKr 450,000	(Sweden) Joakim Bäckström (4)	
16 Oct	Backtee Race to HimmerLand	Denmark	DKr 750,000	(Denmark) Knud Storgaard (3)	

== Order of Merit ==
The Order of Merit was based on tournament results during the season, calculated using a points-based system. The top five players on the Order of Merit earned status to play on the 2011 Challenge Tour.

Position	Player	Points	Status earned
1	(Sweden) Wilhelm Schauman	30,869	Promoted to Challenge Tour
2	(Sweden) Björn Åkesson	28,940	Promoted to Challenge Tour
3	(Sweden) Marcus Palm	28,669	Promoted to Challenge Tour
4	(Denmark) Rasmus Hjelm Nielsen	25,653	Promoted to Challenge Tour
5	(Sweden) Gustav Adell	24,988	Promoted to Challenge Tour
6	(Sweden) Johan Bjerhag	24,698	
7	(Denmark) Knud Storgaard	23,513	
8	(Denmark) Thomas Nørret	21,992	Qualified for European Tour (Top 25 in Q School)
9	(Sweden) Joakim Bäckström	21,822	
10	(Sweden) Victor Almström	21,227	

== See also ==
- 2010 Danish Golf Tour
- 2010 Finnish Tour
- 2010 Swedish Golf Tour
