= Lasse Jensen (golfer) =

Danish professional golfer

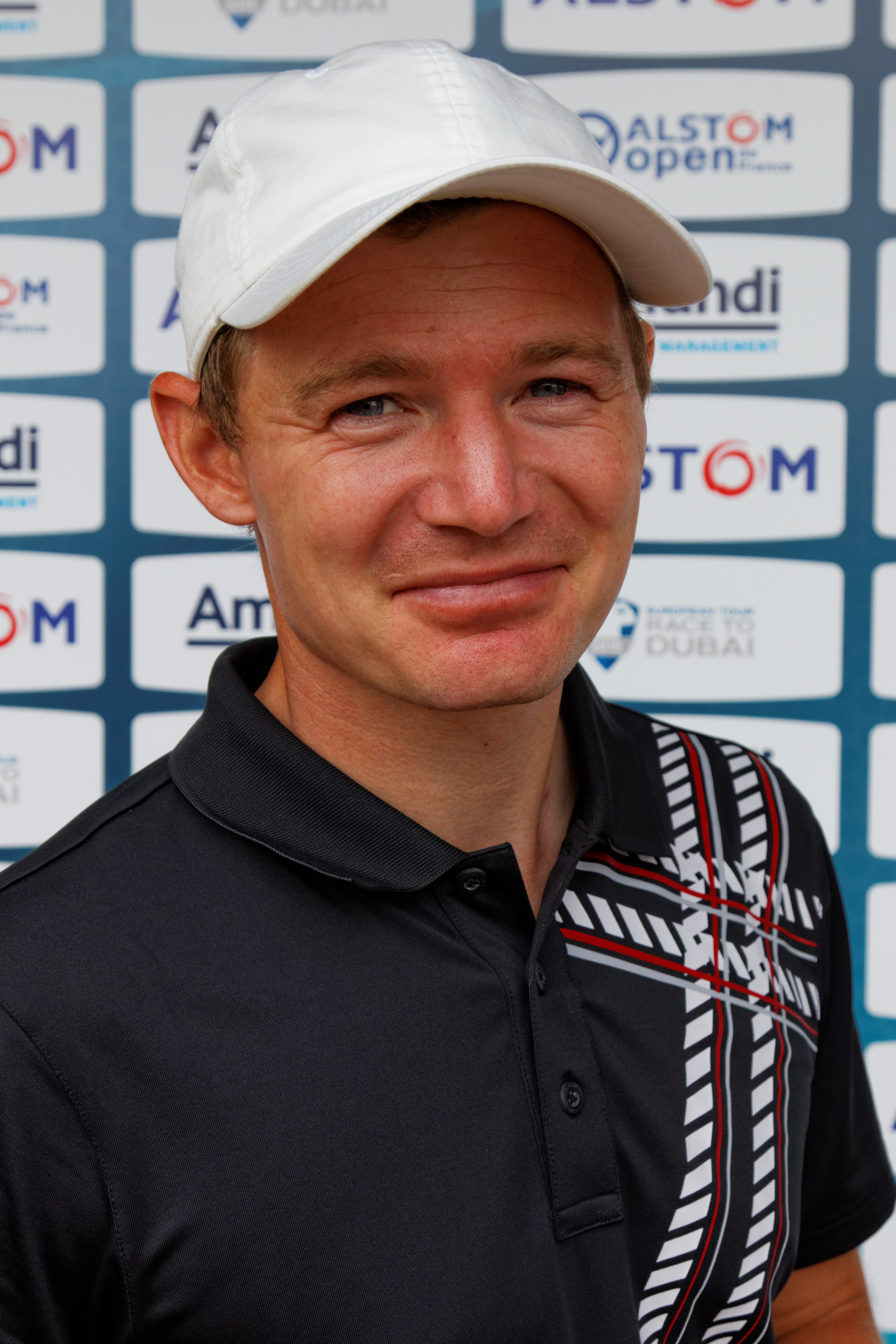
- Jensen in 2015

Personal information
- Nationality: Denmark
- Born: 6 September 1984 (age 42) Hillerød, Denmark
- Height: 1.82 m (6 ft 0 in)
- Weight: 74 kg (163 lb; 11.7 st)

Career
- Sport: Golf
- Turned professional: 2003
- Current tour: Nordic Golf League
- Former tours: European Tour; Challenge Tour; EPD Tour
- Professional wins: 8

Best results in major championships
- Masters Tournament: DNP
- PGA Championship: DNP
- U.S. Open: DNP
- The Open Championship: CUT: 2016

Achievements and awards
- Nordic Golf League Order of Merit winner: 2009

Lasse Jensen (born 6 September 1984) is a Danish professional golfer who has played on the European Tour.

== Nordic Golf League ==
In 2009, he won the Order of Merit for the Nordic Golf League.

== Challenge Tour ==
He has two runner-up finishes on the Challenge Tour at the 2012 and 2014 Barclays Kenya Open.

== European Tour ==
He qualified for the 2013 European Tour by finishing on the final number at European Tour Qualifying School.

For the 2015 European Tour, Jensen finished in 144th place on the Order of Merit, but retained his playing card by way of European Tour Qualifying School.

Jensen finished 2nd at the 2016 Nordea Masters. This finish qualified him for the 2016 Open Championship.

== Professional wins (8) ==
=== EPD Tour wins (1) ===
| No. | Date | Tournament | Winning score | Margin of victory | Runner-up |
|---|---|---|---|---|---|
| 1 | 24 May 2006 | Haus Bey Classic | −5 (71-70-70=211) | 1 stroke | (Germany) Ralf Geilenberg |

=== Nordic Golf League wins (7) ===
| No. | Date | Tournament | Winning score | Margin of victory | Runner(s)-up |
|---|---|---|---|---|---|
| 1 | 2 Aug 2009 | Capitals Masters | −8 (66-72-67=205) | 1 stroke | (Finland) Janne Kaske, (Sweden) Wilhelm Schauman, (Norway) Marius Thorp |
| 2 | 30 Aug 2009 | Landskrona Masters | −9 (69-67-68=204) | 1 stroke | (Sweden) Björn Åkesson, (Sweden) Gustav Andersson, (Sweden) Fredrik Henge, (Sweden) Anders Sjöstrand |
| 3 | 6 Sep 2009 | Ledreborg Danish PGA Championship | −11 (68-67-67=202) | 3 strokes | (Sweden) Niklas Bruzelius |
| 4 | 5 Oct 2013 | Backtee Race to HimmerLand | −1 (70-73-72=215) | 3 strokes | (Sweden) Alexander Björk, (Denmark) Lasse Sonne Nielsen, (Sweden) Patrik Sjöland |
| 5 | 9 Oct 2020 | Lindbytvätten Tour Final | −16 (67-67-66=200) | 1 stroke | (Sweden) Mikael Lindberg |
| 6 | 11 Jun 2021 | Jyske Bank Championship | −14 (69-63-70=202) | 1 stroke | (Sweden) Joakim Wikström |
| 7 | 2 Jul 2021 | Junet Open | −12 (72-68-64=204) | 4 strokes | (Sweden) Robert S. Karlsson |

== Playoff record ==
Challenge Tour playoff record (0–1)

| No. | Year | Tournament | Opponent | Result |
|---|---|---|---|---|
| 1 | 2012 | Barclays Kenya Open | (England) Seve Benson | Lost to birdie on first extra hole |

== Results in major championships ==
| Tournament | 2016 |
|---|---|
| Masters Tournament | |
| U.S. Open | |
| The Open Championship | CUT |
| PGA Championship | |

Did not play

CUT = missed the half-way cut
"T" = tied

== See also ==
- 2012 European Tour Qualifying School graduates
- 2014 European Tour Qualifying School graduates
- 2015 European Tour Qualifying School graduates
