= Ludvig Åberg =

Swedish golfer (born 1999)

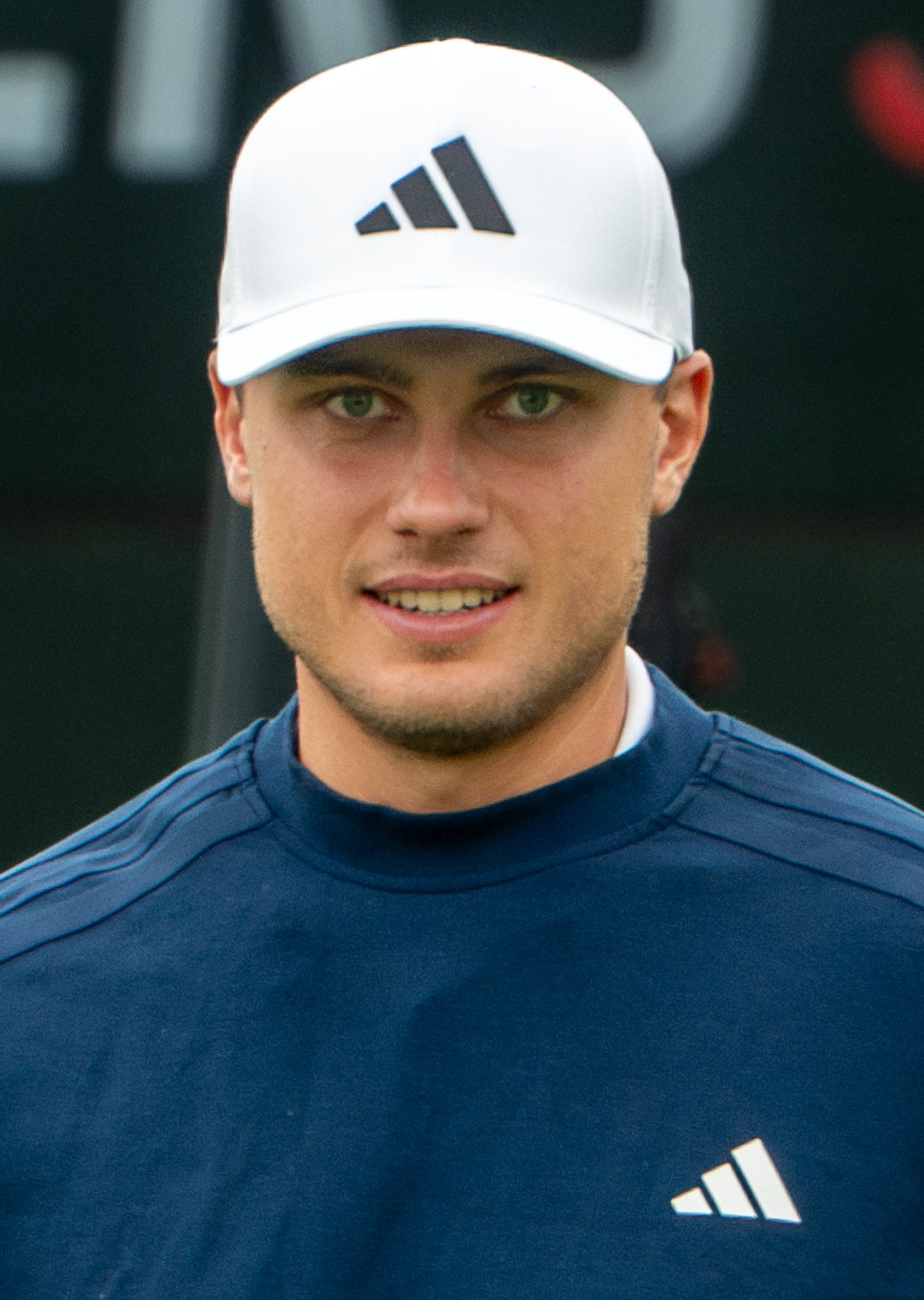
- Åberg at the 2025 Travelers Championship

Personal information
- Full name: Ludvig Noa Åberg
- Nationality: Sweden
- Born: 31 October 1999 (age 27) Eslöv, Sweden
- Height: 6 ft 3 in (191 cm)
- Weight: 190 lb (86 kg)
- Life partner: Olivia Peet

Career
- Sport: Golf
- College: Texas Tech University
- Turned professional: 2023
- Current tours: PGA Tour; European Tour
- Former tour: Swedish Golf Tour
- Professional wins: 5
- Highest ranking: 4 (16 June 2024) (as of 25 October 2026)

Number of wins by tour
- PGA Tour: 2
- European Tour: 1
- Other: 2

Best results in major championships
- Masters Tournament: 2nd: 2024
- PGA Championship: T4: 2026
- U.S. Open: T12: 2024
- The Open Championship: T9: 2026

Achievements and awards
- Annika Sörenstam Trophy: 2016
- Ben Hogan Award: 2022, 2023
- Haskins Award: 2023
- Jack Nicklaus Award: 2023
- Swedish Golfer of the Year: 2023, 2024

Ludvig Noa Åberg (Swedish pronunciation: [ˈlɵ̌dːvɪɡ ˈoːbɛrj], English pronunciation: LOOD-vig OH-berg; born 31 October 1999) is a Swedish professional golfer who plays on the PGA Tour and the European Tour.

Before turning professional in June 2023, Åberg had been ranked number one in the World Amateur Golf Ranking for a total of 29 weeks. He finished on top of the 2022–23 PGA Tour University rankings to earn membership on the tour. Within five months of turning professional, Åberg achieved his first tournament victories on both the European Tour and the PGA Tour and was a member of the winning European team in the 2023 Ryder Cup. He finished runner-up in his major championship debut at the 2024 Masters Tournament and won the 2025 Ryder Cup with team Europe.

== Early life ==
Åberg was born on 31 October 1999 in Eslöv, Sweden, to parents Mia and Johan, and has an elder sister named Linnea. He was introduced to golf at age eight at the Eslöv Golf Club by his father, who was a keen golfer. Initially not fond of the game, his father encouraged him by offering him ice cream if he stayed an extra hour at the course.

Åberg also played football (soccer) until focusing on golf at age thirteen. At fifteen, he earned a place at Filbornaskolan, a sports-specialized high school in Helsingborg. Åberg was in the same year group at the school as future Solheim Cup players Maja Stark and Linn Grant.

== Amateur career ==
=== 2016–2020 ===
In 2016, Åberg was awarded the Annika Sörenstam Trophy after winning the Swedish Teen Tour Order of Merit. He was individual leader at the 2017 European Boys' Team Championship, and won the 2017 Fairhaven Trophy. He finished third individually at the 2018 Toyota Junior Golf World Cup, and made his European Tour debut at the 2018 Nordea Masters, where he made the cut and finished tied 34th.

In 2019, Åberg was runner-up at the African Amateur Stroke Play Championship, and was a member of the winning Swedish team at the 2019 European Amateur Team Championship. Later in the year, he moved to the United States to start college at Texas Tech University on an athletic scholarship, joining the Red Raiders golf team. He ended 2019 with a win at the Sun Bowl Marathon All-America Golf Classic.

As the 2020 collegiate season was cut short due to the COVID-19 pandemic, Åberg returned to Sweden and competed on the Swedish Golf Tour. In July, he recorded his first victory in a professional tournament, at the Katrineholm Open. The following week, Åberg won again on the Swedish Golf Tour. He birdied five of his closing six holes to win the Barsebäck Resort Masters by five strokes. In December, he represented the International Team at the 2020 Arnold Palmer Cup. He went 4–0 in his matches, as the Internationals won by a score of 40 1/2–19 1/2.

=== 2021–2023 ===
In February 2021, Åberg won the Jones Cup Invitational. He was co-champion at The Prestige later that month, and also the co-champion at the Thunderbird Collegiate in April. In June, he was runner-up at the European Amateur. Åberg was awarded a gold medal in September by the European Golf Association as the top-ranked European amateur golfer of the season, having topped the rankings since March. He made his debut on the PGA Tour in October, as a sponsor's exemption at the Bermuda Championship. He made the cut and finished in a tie for 51st place.

In the spring of 2022, Åberg turned down a 2-year contract worth US$2,500,000 from the newly established LIV Golf League, and continued his collegiate career at Texas Tech University. He won The Prestige for a second time in February, and in April he won the individual title at the Big 12 Men's Golf Championship. Åberg was named in May the Ben Hogan Award winner, as the best college player in the United States. In September, he represented Sweden at the 2022 Eisenhower Trophy, where his team were runners-up and he tied for 7th individually. He rose to number one in the World Amateur Golf Ranking for the first time in September 2022.

Through leading the PGA Tour University rankings, Åberg earned an invitation to compete in the Hero Dubai Desert Classic on the European Tour in January 2023. He held a share of the lead after the first round. In February, he won The Prestige for a third consecutive year. In March, he received a sponsor exemption to the Arnold Palmer Invitational, where he finished tied for 24th place. In April, Åberg broke the scoring record at the Big 12 Men's Golf Championship, to become the first golfer to retain the individual title, and in May he won the Ben Hogan Award for a second time. Åberg secured exempt status on the PGA Tour through the 2024 season by finishing on top of the 2022–23 PGA Tour University rankings, the first year of this exemption in force. He turned professional in June 2023, ending his amateur career ranked number one on the World Amateur Golf Ranking.

== Professional career ==
=== 2023 ===
Åberg made his debut as a professional in June 2023 at the RBC Canadian Open on the PGA Tour, where he made the cut and finished in a tie for 25th place. In July, at the John Deere Classic, he recorded his first top-10 on the tour; a final-round 63 put him in a tie for fourth place, three strokes behind winner Sepp Straka. Towards the end of August, Åberg travelled to Europe to compete on the DP World Tour. At the D+D Real Czech Masters, he tied for fourth place after a final-round 66. The following week at the Omega European Masters, he recorded his first win as a professional. He birdied four of the closing five holes in his final round of 64 to finish two strokes ahead of his fellow countryman Alexander Björk. Two weeks later, at the BMW PGA Championship, Åberg held the lead after 54 holes, before a final-round 76 saw him finish in a tie for 10th place.

Following his victory at the European Masters, on 4 September 2023, Åberg was announced by European captain Luke Donald as one of his six captain's picks for Team Europe at the 2023 Ryder Cup. He became the first player to be selected for a Ryder Cup without having played in a major championship, and the second, after Sergio García, to make a Ryder Cup team during the same year as turning professional. He played four matches at the Ryder Cup, tallying a 2–2–0 record, as Europe won the event 16 1/2–11 1/2. In the Saturday foursomes session, he and Viktor Hovland recorded a 9 and 7 victory over world number one Scottie Scheffler and reigning PGA Champion Brooks Koepka, setting a new record for the largest winning margin in an 18-hole Ryder Cup match.

The week after the Ryder Cup, Åberg returned to the PGA Tour and finished as joint runner-up in the Sanderson Farms Championship, losing to Luke List in a five-man playoff. In November, Åberg won his first tournament on the PGA Tour, the RSM Classic. He shot back-to-back rounds of 61 on the weekend to finish at 29-under-par, four strokes ahead of Mackenzie Hughes. His 72-hole-score of 253 tied the PGA Tour scoring record held by Justin Thomas. This victory moved Åberg into the top 50 of the Official World Golf Ranking and secured him an invitation to the 2024 Masters Tournament, which would be his first major championship appearance.

=== 2024 ===
At the start of the 2024 season, Åberg switched caddies, replacing Jack Clarke with Rickie Fowler's former caddie Joe Skovron. In February, at the AT&T Pebble Beach Pro-Am, he was in solo-second place after 54 holes, one stroke behind Wyndham Clark. Due to inclement weather, the tournament was called off and Clark declared the winner before the final round could take place. The result moved Åberg to 11th on the Official World Golf Ranking.

Åberg made his major championship debut at the 2024 Masters Tournament in April, finishing solo second to world number one Scottie Scheffler. Two weeks later, he moved to a career-best number six on the Official World Golf Ranking, after starting 2023 outside 3000th. At the 2024 PGA Championship in May, he missed the cut on the number, his first missed cut of the season. During the 2024 U.S. Open in June, Åberg held the lead after two rounds, but a triple-bogey during the third round led to him falling out of contention. He ultimately finished in tied-12th place.

At the Genesis Scottish Open in July, Åberg held a two-stroke lead headed into the final round, before a three-over 73 on Sunday caused him to finish in a tie for fourth. The following week, he made his debut at The Open Championship. He missed the cut after carding rounds of 75 and 76. In August, Åberg recorded his third runner-up finish of the year, placing tied-second at the BMW Championship, one shot behind Keegan Bradley.

On 1 September, after finishing 16th at the Tour Championship, Åberg announced that he would undergo arthroscopic surgery to repair a torn meniscus in his left knee, an injury which he sustained in May and caused him discomfort through the season.

=== 2025 ===
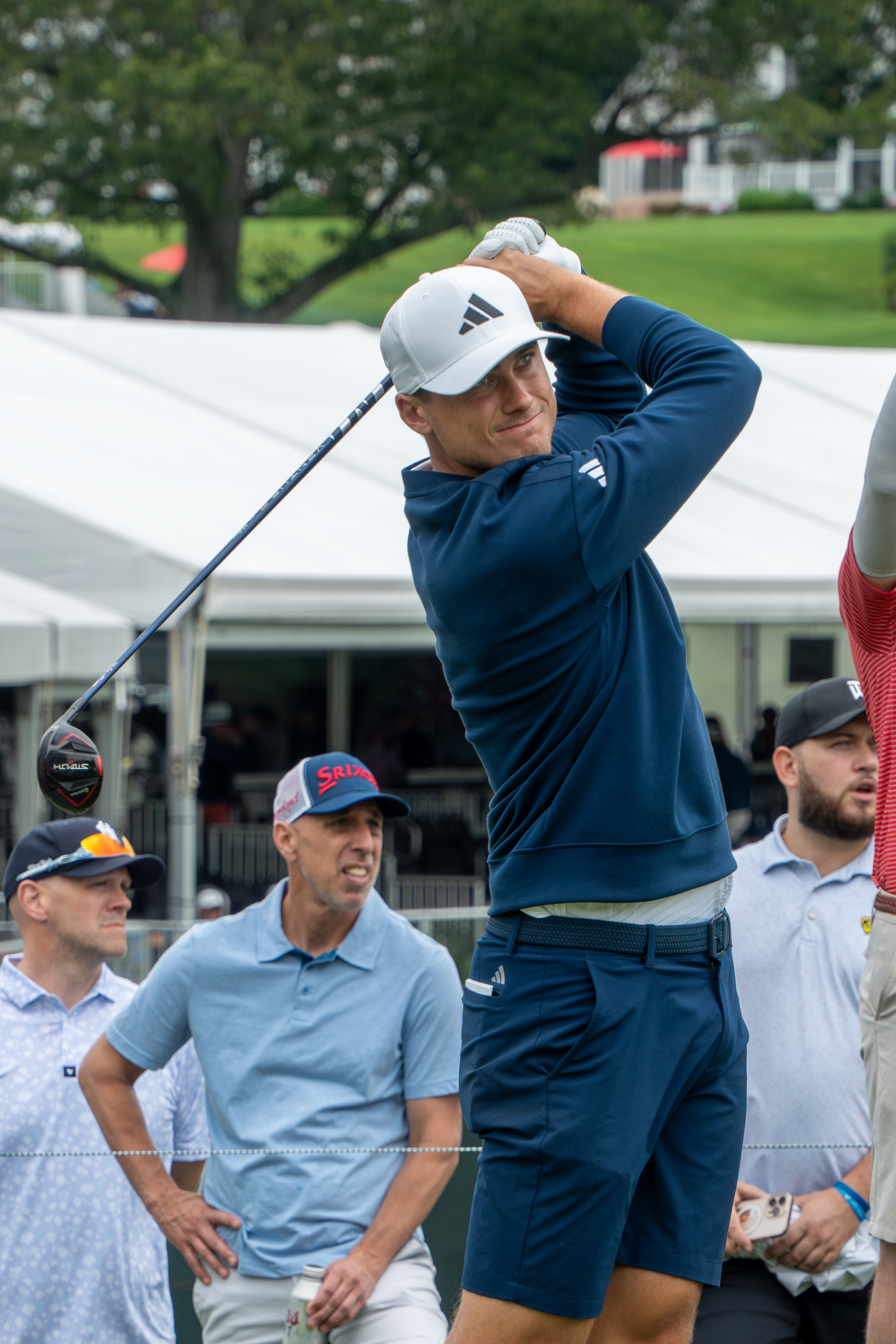
Ludvig Åberg during the 2025 Travelers Championship

In February, Åberg recorded the second win of his PGA Tour career at the Genesis Invitational. He birdied the final hole to shoot a final-round 66 and win by one stroke over Maverick McNealy. During the third round, Åberg made the first hole-in-one of his professional career. With the victory, he earned $4 million and moved atop the PGA Tour money list. At the 2025 Masters Tournament, Åberg was briefly tied for the lead with Rory McIlroy and Justin Rose at 10-under with two holes to go, but finished the 17th and 18th holes a total of four-over-par to tumble out of contention.

Åberg competed in the 2025 Ryder Cup at Bethpage, where Europe defeated the United States 15–13. He contributed on the final day by becoming the only European player to win his singles match, defeating Patrick Cantlay. The victory was Europe's fifth on American soil and the first since 2012.

== Awards and honors ==
- In November 2021, Åberg was elected honorary member of Eslöv Golf Club.
- He won the Ben Hogan Award as the best collegiate player in the United States in both 2022 and 2023.
- Åberg also won the Haskins Award and the Jack Nicklaus Award for the 2023 season.
- In 2023, he received Elit Sign number 152 by the Swedish Golf Federation based on world ranking achievements.
- Åberg was named as the Swedish Golfer of the Year, male or female, professional or amateur, for the 2023 season as well as for the 2024 season.
- In 2024, he was awarded honorary member of the PGA of Sweden.

== Personal life ==
After turning professional, Åberg rented part of the home belonging to fellow Swedish PGA Tour golfer Vincent Norrman in Tallahassee, Florida. In November 2024, Åberg moved into a house in Ponte Vedra, Florida, with his girlfriend Olivia Peet, from Manchester, England, who played tennis at Texas Tech University.

== Amateur wins ==
- 2016 Galvin Green Junior Open, Skandia Junior Open
- 2017 Fairhaven Trophy
- 2019 Sun Bowl All-America Classic
- 2021 Jones Cup Invitational, The Prestige, Thunderbird Collegiate
- 2022 The Prestige, Big 12 Men's Championship
- 2023 The Prestige, Valspar Collegiate, Big 12 Men's Championship, NCAA Norman Regional

== Professional wins (5) ==
=== PGA Tour wins (2) ===
Legend
Signature events (1)
Other PGA Tour (1)

No.	Date	Tournament	Winning score	Margin of victory	Runner-up
1	19 Nov 2023	RSM Classic	−29 (67-64-61-61=253)	4 strokes	(Canada) Mackenzie Hughes
2	16 Feb 2025	Genesis Invitational	−12 (74-66-70-66=276)	1 stroke	(United States) Maverick McNealy

PGA Tour playoff record (0–1)

No.	Year	Tournament	Opponents	Result
1	2023	Sanderson Farms Championship	(United States) Ben Griffin, (United States) Luke List, (Sweden) Henrik Norlander, (United States) Scott Stallings	List won with birdie on first extra hole

=== European Tour wins (1) ===
No.	Date	Tournament	Winning score	Margin of victory	Runner-up
1	3 Sep 2023	Omega European Masters	−19 (64-67-66-64=261)	2 strokes	(Sweden) Alexander Björk

=== Swedish Golf Tour wins (2) ===
No.	Date	Tournament	Winning score	Margin of victory	Runner-up
1	4 Jul 2020	Katrineholm Open (as an amateur)	−10 (67-70-69=206)	Playoff	(Sweden) Mikael Lindberg
2	16 July 2020	Barsebäck Resort Masters (as an amateur)	−15 (69-67-68=204)	5 strokes	(Sweden) Mikael Lindberg

== Results in major championships ==
Tournament	2024	2025	2026
Masters Tournament	2	7	T21
PGA Championship	CUT	CUT	T4
U.S. Open	T12	CUT	T17
The Open Championship	CUT	T23	T9

Top 10

CUT = missed the half-way cut
"T" = tied

=== Summary ===
Tournament	Wins	2nd	3rd	Top-5	Top-10	Top-25	Events	Cuts made
Masters Tournament	0	1	0	1	2	3	3	3
PGA Championship	0	0	0	1	1	1	3	1
U.S. Open	0	0	0	0	0	2	3	2
The Open Championship	0	0	0	0	1	2	3	2
Totals	0	1	0	2	4	8	12	8

- Most consecutive cuts made – 5 (2025 The Open Championship – 2026 Open Championship, current)
- Longest streak of top-10s – 1 (four times, current)

== Results in The Players Championship ==
Tournament	2024	2025	2026
The Players Championship	8	CUT	T5

Top 10

CUT = missed the halfway cut

== Team appearances ==
Amateur

- European Boys' Team Championship (representing Sweden): 2017
- European Amateur Team Championship (representing Sweden): 2018, 2019 (winners), 2021
- Junior Golf World Cup (representing Sweden): 2018
- Arnold Palmer Cup (representing the International Team): 2020 (winners), 2022 (winners)
- Eisenhower Trophy (representing Sweden): 2022

Professional

- Ryder Cup (representing Europe): 2023 (winners), 2025 (winners)

Ryder Cup points record
2023	2025	Total
2	2	4
