= 2004 EPD Tour =

Golf tour season

2004 EPD Tour season
- Duration: 26 February 2004 – 12 September 2004
- Number of official events: 16
- Most wins: (Denmark) Søren Juul (3)
- Order of Merit: (Denmark) Søren Juul

The 2004 EPD Tour, titled as the 2004 Pro Tour Esprit for sponsorship reasons, was the eighth season of the EPD Tour, a third-tier tour recognised by the European Tour.

== Schedule ==
The following table lists official events during the 2004 season.

Date	Tournament	Host country	Purse (€)	Winner (Note: The number in brackets after each winner's name is the number of EPD Tour events they had won up to and including that tournament. It is rare for someone to accumulate many wins on the EPD Tour as success at this level usually leads to promotion to the Challenge Tour.)
28 Feb	Winter Series	Germany	50,000	(Germany) Jochen Lupprian (2)
7 Apr	Kempferhof Classic	France	25,000	(Denmark) Søren Juul (2)
21 Apr	Jakobsberg Classic	Germany	25,000	(Sweden) Paul Nilbrink (1)
5 May	Märkischer Classic	Germany	25,000	(Germany) Christoph Günther (5)
12 May	Haus Bey Classic	Germany	25,000	(Belgium) Arnaud Langenaeken (2)
19 May	Central German Open	Germany	30,000	(Germany) Richard Porter (3)
25 May	Hohenpähl Classic	Germany	30,000	(Sweden) Paul Nilbrink (2)
9 Jun	Basler Versicherung Classic	France	30,000	(United States) Peter Bronson (1)
19 Jun	Lich Classic	Germany	30,000	(Germany) Michael Thannhäuser (1)
30 Jun	Gleidingen Classic	Germany	25,000	(Germany) Tino Schuster (1)
6 Jul	Gut Neuenhof Open	Germany	30,000	(Scotland) Ross Bain (1)
13 Jul	Velderhof Classic	Germany	25,000	(Germany) Matthias Ziegler (2)
21 Jul	Sybrook Classic	Netherlands	20,000	(United States) Peter Bronson (2)
4 Aug	Central European Open	Germany	30,000	(Denmark) Søren Juul (3)
10 Aug	Schärding Classic	Austria	30,000	(Germany) Tino Schuster (2)
12 Sep	Wallonia Pro-Am	Belgium	30,000	(Denmark) Søren Juul (4)

== Order of Merit ==
The Order of Merit was based on prize money won during the season, calculated in Euros. The top five players on the Order of Merit earned status to play on the 2005 Challenge Tour.

Position	Player	Prize money (€)	Status earned
1	(Denmark) Søren Juul	22,750	Promoted to Challenge Tour
2	(Belgium) Arnaud Langenaeken	14,837	Promoted to Challenge Tour
3	(Sweden) Paul Nilbrink	13,234	Promoted to Challenge Tour
4	(Denmark) John Davies	13,109	Promoted to Challenge Tour
5	(United States) Peter Bronson	13,046	Promoted to Challenge Tour
6	(Germany) Tino Schuster	11,810	
7	(Scotland) Ross Bain	11,658	
8	(Germany) Richard Porter	11,510	
9	(Netherlands) Guido van der Valk	9,580	
10	(France) François Nicolas	9,371	
