= Paul Nilbrink =

Swedish professional golfer (born 1971)

Personal information
- Nationality: Sweden (until 2004); Norway (2005–)
- Born: 2 May 1971 (age 55) Epsom, England
- Height: 6 ft 2 in (1.88 m)

Career
- Sport: Golf
- College: University of Central Florida
- Turned professional: 1996
- Former tours: Challenge Tour; Nordic Golf League; EPD Tour
- Professional wins: 9

Number of wins by tour
- Challenge Tour: 2
- Other: 7

Achievements and awards
- PGA Sweden Order of Merit Rookie of the Year: 1996

Paul Nilbrink (born 2 May 1971) is an English-born former Swedish professional golfer who has also represented Norway since 2005. He played on the Challenge Tour from 1996 to 2008, winning the 1999 Volvo Finnish Open and the 2000 Norwegian Open.

== Career ==
Nilbrink was born in England and grew up in Belgium and Sweden. He had a late development in golf and had a handicap of 36 by age 12, and 13 at age 15. He later studied for a Bachelor of Science in Physical Education at the University of Central Florida in the United States.

As an amateur he fought an international match with the Swedish National Team in Hubbelrath, Germany, against Ireland, France and Germany. In addition, he was on the winning team of the Nordic golf championships at Nordcenter Finland. In 1995, he was low qualifier in the Dixie Amateur (Fort Lauderdale, Florida) with the scores of 68, 71, beating Tiger Woods by 7 shots.

Nilbrink turned professional in 1996 and joined the Challenge Tour. His best finish this season was as semi-finalist (3rd) at SM Match, and he finished the season Rookie of the Year on the PGA Sweden Order of Merit.

The following year he fought an international match with the Swedish National Team in Hubbelrath, Germany, against Ireland, France and Germany.

Nilbrink established himself as a regular player on the Challenge Tour and finished top-10 14 times, including winning the 1999 Volvo Finnish Open and the 2000 Norwegian Open. He came close to qualifying for the European Tour but missed the cut by 1 stroke, 3 times.

Nilbrink entered the 2005 European Tour qualifying school in Spain. He was in eighth place for a long time, but ultimately had to settle for a place outside the top 30, losing out on automatic entry to the Tour. He tried again to qualify for the European Tour in 2006, with the same result.

== Personal life ==
Nilbrink, whose wife is Norwegian, relocated to Norway and took up Norwegian citizenship in late 2004.

== Professional wins (9) ==
=== Challenge Tour wins (2) ===
No.	Date	Tournament	Winning score	Margin of victory	Runner(s)-up
1	11 Jul 1999	Volvo Finnish Open	−7 (69-72-68-72=281)	Playoff	(Argentina) Gustavo Rojas
2	20 Aug 2000	Norwegian Open	−10 (70-66-70=206)	Playoff	(Sweden) Per Larsson, (England) Stuart Little

Challenge Tour playoff record (2–0)

No.	Year	Tournament	Opponents	Result
1	1999	Volvo Finnish Open	(Argentina) Gustavo Rojas	Won with par on third extra hole
2	2000	Norwegian Open	(Sweden) Per Larsson, (England) Stuart Little	Won with birdie on second extra hole Little eliminated by par on first hole

=== EPD Tour wins (2) ===
No.	Date	Tournament	Winning score	Margin of victory	Runner-up
1	21 Apr 2004	Jakobsberg Classic	−13 (67-69-66=203)	2 strokes	(Denmark) Søren Juul
2	25 May 2004	Hohenpähl Classic	−7 (70-71-68=209)	1 stroke	(Scotland) Ross Bain

=== Nordic Golf League wins (2) ===
No.	Date	Tournament	Winning score	Margin of victory	Runner(s)-up
1	21 Jun 2009	Galvin Green Tour I	−13 (63-66-71=200)	1 stroke	(Norway) Ross Robertson
2	6 Sep 2009	Galvin Green Tour II	−8 (74-70-64=208)	5 strokes	(Sweden) Johan Bjerhag, (Norway) Ofeigur Johann Gudjonson

=== Other wins (3) ===
- 2009 Aegean Airlines Pro Am
- 2008 Dalsland Golf Resort Open
- 2013 Szczecin Open
