= 2021 Nordic Golf League =

Golf tour season

2021 Nordic Golf League season
- Duration: 14 April 2021 – 22 October 2021
- Number of official events: 27 (Note: A further two tournaments were scheduled but were cancelled.)
- Most wins: (Sweden) Christopher Feldborg Nielsen (3)
- Order of Merit: (Sweden) Christopher Feldborg Nielsen

The 2021 Nordic Golf League was the 23rd season of the Nordic Golf League, a third-tier tour recognised by the European Tour.

== Schedule ==
The following table lists official events during the 2021 season.

Date	Tournament	Host country	Purse	Winner (Note: The number in brackets after each winner's name is the number of Nordic Golf League events they had won up to and including that tournament. It is rare for someone to accumulate many wins on the Nordic Golf League as success at this level usually leads to promotion to the Challenge Tour.)	OWGR points	Other tours (Note: CHA − Challenge Tour.)
~~22 Feb~~	Lumine Hills Open	Spain	–	Cancelled	–	
~~28 Feb~~	Lumine Lakes Open	Spain	–	Cancelled	–	
16 Apr; ~~6 Mar~~	ECCO Tour Spanish Masters	Spain	€50,000	(Denmark) Marcus Helligkilde (3)	4	
20 Apr; ~~10 Mar~~	PGA Catalunya Resort Championship	Spain	€50,000	(Sweden) Mikael Lundberg (2)	4	
6 May	Lindbytvätten Grand Opening	Sweden	SKr 420,000	(Sweden) Hampus Bergman (2)	4	
14 May	Made in HimmerLand Qualifier	Denmark	€35,000	(Denmark) John Axelsen (1)	4	
22 May	TanumStrand Fjällbacka Open	Sweden	SKr 350,000	(Sweden) Robert S. Karlsson (1)	4	
4 Jun	Stockholm Trophy	Sweden	SKr 420,000	(Sweden) Jesper Kennegård (5)	4	
11 Jun	Jyske Bank Championship	Denmark	€35,000	(Denmark) Lasse Jensen (6)	4	
18 Jun	Samsø Pro-Am Classic	Denmark	€30,000	(Sweden) Joakim Wikström (4)	4	
24 Jun	Halmstad Challenge	Sweden	SKr 400,000	(Denmark) Nicolai Nøhr Madsen (1)	7	
2 Jul	Junet Open	Sweden	SKr 430,000	(Denmark) Lasse Jensen (7)	4	
10 Jul	Live It Katrineholm Open	Sweden	SKr 430,000	(Sweden) Hannes Rönneblad (1)	4	
24 Jul	Audi Finnish PGA Golf Tour Championship	Finland	€40,000	(Finland) Niclas Hellberg (2)	4	
31 Jul	Göteborg Open	Sweden	SKr 420,000	(Sweden) Jonathan Ågren (2)	4	
6 Aug	Frederikshavn Championship	Denmark	€35,000	(Sweden) Tobias Edén (1)	4	
14 Aug	Made in Esbjerg Challenge	Denmark	€200,000	(Portugal) Ricardo Gouveia (n/a)	9	CHA
16 Aug	Bråviken Open	Sweden	SKr 400,000	(Sweden) Adam Eineving (1)	4	
20 Aug	Sydbank Esbjerg Challenge	Denmark	€200,000	(Norway) Espen Kofstad (n/a)	9	CHA
21 Aug	PGA Championship Landeryd Masters	Sweden	SKr 600,000	(Sweden) Christopher Feldborg Nielsen (3)	6	
27 Aug	Thisted Forsikring Championship	Denmark	€35,000	(Sweden) Elis Svärd (1)	4	
4 Sep	Timberwise Finnish Open	Finland	€55,000	(Sweden) Christopher Feldborg Nielsen (4)	4	
10 Sep	Trust Forsikring Championship	Denmark	€35,000	(Denmark) Nicolai Tinning (3)	4	
17 Sep	Great Northern Challenge	Denmark	DKr 500,000	(Denmark) Peter Launer Bæk (2)	4	
24 Sep	Big Green Egg Swedish Matchplay Championship	Sweden	SKr 430,000	(Sweden) Sebastian Petersen (1)	4	
30 Sep	Visby Open	Sweden	SKr 400,000	(Norway) Jarand Ekeland Arnøy (2)	4	
8 Oct	Race to HimmerLand	Denmark	€35,000	(Sweden) Niclas Johansson (2)	4	
15 Oct	MoreGolf Mastercard Tour Final	Sweden	SKr 500,000	(Sweden) Sebastian Petersen (2)	4	
22 Oct	Road to Europe Tour Final	Denmark	€30,000	(Sweden) Christopher Feldborg Nielsen (5)	4	

== Order of Merit ==
The Order of Merit was titled as the GolfBox Road to Europe and was based on tournament results during the season, calculated using a points-based system. The top five players on the Order of Merit earned status to play on the 2022 Challenge Tour.

Position	Player	Points	Status earned
1	(Sweden) Christopher Feldborg Nielsen	43,578	Promoted to Challenge Tour
2	(Denmark) Lasse Jensen	42,106	Promoted to Challenge Tour
3	(Sweden) Joakim Wikström	36,694	Promoted to Challenge Tour
4	(Sweden) Adam Blommé	31,380	Promoted to Challenge Tour
5	(Denmark) Peter Launer Bæk	31,165	Promoted to Challenge Tour
6	(Sweden) Jesper Kennegård	28,875	Finished in Top 70 of Challenge Tour Rankings
7	(Denmark) Nicolai Tinning	28,216	
8	(Sweden) Björn Åkesson	23,422	
9	(Sweden) Sebastian Petersen	21,438	
10	(Sweden) Hannes Rönneblad	21,399	

== See also ==
- 2021 Danish Golf Tour
- 2021 Swedish Golf Tour
