= Christoph Günther =

German professional golfer

Personal information
- Full name: Christoph Joseph Günther
- Nationality: Germany
- Born: 22 July 1975 (age 51) Göttingen, West Germany
- Height: 5 ft 10 in (1.78 m)
- Weight: 168 lb (76 kg; 12.0 st)

Career
- Sport: Golf
- Turned professional: 1995
- Former tours: Challenge Tour; EPD Tour
- Professional wins: 20

Number of wins by tour
- Challenge Tour: 1
- Other: 19

Christoph Joseph Günther (born 22 July 1975) is a German professional golfer who has played on the Challenge Tour and the EPD Tour.

== Career ==
In 1975, Günther was born in Göttingen. He mainly played on the EPD Tour since turning professional in 1995. He won 10 times on the EPD Tour between 2001 and 2012.

Günther won his first tournament on the Challenge Tour in 2009 at the Kärnten Golf Open. He entered the final round five strokes behind the leader but shot a fantastic final round of 62 (−10) to win by a stroke. The win put him into a good position to finish high enough on the Challenge Tour's 2009 money list to earn a European Tour card for 2010.

== Professional wins (20) ==
=== Challenge Tour wins (1) ===
No.	Date	Tournament	Winning score	Margin of victory	Runners-up
1	7 Jun 2009	Kärnten Golf Open	−20 (68-63-75-62=268)	1 stroke	(Germany) Florian Fritsch, (Spain) Carlos Rodiles

=== EPD Tour wins (10) ===
No.	Date	Tournament	Winning score	Margin of victory	Runner(s)-up
1	29 May 2001	Schärding Classic	−10 (69-67=136)	3 strokes	(Belgium) Arnaud Langenaeken
2	18 Jun 2001	Königsfeld Classic	−1 (69-70=139)	4 strokes	(Germany) Patrick Platz
3	4 Jul 2001	Spessart Classic	−6 (67-71=138)	4 strokes	(Germany) Christian Arenz
4	29 Jul 2003	Winnerod Classic	−14 (66-64=130)	3 strokes	(Germany) Jochen Lupprian
5	5 May 2004	Märkischer Classic	−8 (68-70-70=208)	3 strokes	(Denmark) Søren Juul
6	6 Oct 2007	JOB AG EPD Championship	−13 (65-70-68=203)	1 stroke	(Switzerland) Damian Ulrich
7	30 Jan 2008	Sueno Classic	+1 (72-73-72=217)	2 strokes	(Germany) Christian Reimbold
8	11 Jun 2008	Licher Classic	−11 (66-67-72=205)	1 stroke	(Germany) Malte Brenner
9	25 Jan 2011	Tat Golf Classic	−10 (66-69-71=206)	3 strokes	(Germany) Maximilian Glauert
10	22 Aug 2012	Golfspielen.de Open	−7 (72-69-68=209)	3 strokes	(Germany) Max Kramer, (Germany) Daniel Wünsche

=== Other wins (9) ===
- 1999 Brose Coburg Open (Germany)
- 2001 German PGA Championship
- 2003 German PGA Championship
- 2005 Bad Homburger Open (Germany)
- 2006 German PGA Team Championship (with Marcel Haremza)
- 2007 German PGA Team Championship (with Marcel Haremza)
- 2010 German PGA Team Championship (with Marcel Haremza)
- 2021 PGA Pro Day Rethmar Golf Links, PGA Pro Day Golfclub München-Riedhof
