= James Ruth =

English golfer (born 1985)

Personal information
- Full name: James Alexander Ruth
- Nationality: England
- Born: 21 January 1985 (age 41) Plymouth, England
- Height: 1.88 m (6 ft 2 in)
- Weight: 78 kg (172 lb; 12.3 st)

Career
- Sport: Golf
- Turned professional: 2006
- Former tours: European Tour; Challenge Tour; EPD Tour
- Professional wins: 9

Achievements and awards
- EPD Tour Order of Merit winner: 2008

James Alexander Ruth (born 21 January 1985) is an English professional golfer.

== Career ==
Ruth was born in Plymouth, England.

Ruth was the Order of Merit (money) leader on the third-tier EPD Tour in 2008. In 2008, he had three wins on the EPD tour earning €23,440.93. He spent the 2010 season on the European Tour.

== Professional wins (9) ==
=== EPD Tour wins (5) ===
No.	Date	Tournament	Winning score	Margin of victory	Runner(s)-up
1	28 Feb 2007	Mosa Trajectum Classic	−11 (71-66-68=205)	1 stroke	(Netherlands) Joost Luiten
2	20 Jun 2007	Licher Classic	−11 (69-65-71=205)	4 strokes	(Germany) Gary Birch Jr., (Netherlands) Rick Huiskamp, (England) Grant Jackson
3	1 Jul 2008	Coburg Brose Open	−16 (71-65-64=200)	3 strokes	(Germany) Max Kramer
4	13 Aug 2008	Harderwold Classic	−11 (62-68-69=199)	2 strokes	(Germany) Max Kramer
5	19 Aug 2008	Preis des Hardenburg GolfResort	−7 (65-71-70=206)	Playoff	(Germany) Bernd Ritthammer

=== Hi5 Pro Tour wins (2) ===
No.	Date	Tournament	Winning score	Margin of victory	Runner-up
1	17 Nov 2011	Altorreal Futures Open	−12 (64-68-72=204)	3 strokes	(Denmark) Daniel Løkke
2	9 Feb 2012	Hacienda de Alamo Open	−8 (68-71-69=208)	2 strokes	(Sweden) Gustav Adell

=== Jamega Pro Golf Tour wins (2) ===
No.	Date	Tournament	Winning score	Margin of victory	Runner-up
1	25 Jul 2011	The Shropshire	−10 (70-64=134)	2 strokes	(Australia) Nigel Lane
2	3 Oct 2011	Bowood	−8 (69-67=136)	8 strokes	(England) Lee James, (England) Jordan Smith (a)

== Team appearances ==
Professional

- PGA Cup (representing Great Britain and Ireland): 2022

== See also ==
- 2009 European Tour Qualifying School graduates
