= 2008 EPD Tour =

Golf tour season

2008 EPD Tour season
- Duration: 21 January 2008 – 5 October 2008
- Number of official events: 20
- Most wins: (England) James Ruth (3)
- Order of Merit: (England) James Ruth

The 2008 EPD Tour, titled as the 2008 Renault EPD Tour for sponsorship reasons, was the 12th season of the EPD Tour, a third-tier tour recognised by the European Tour.

== Schedule ==
The following table lists official events during the 2008 season.

| Date | Tournament | Host country | Purse (€) | Winner (Note: The number in brackets after each winner's name is the number of EPD Tour events they had won up to and including that tournament. It is rare for someone to accumulate many wins on the EPD Tour as success at this level usually leads to promotion to the Challenge Tour.) |
|---|---|---|---|---|
| 23 Jan | Siren Classic | Turkey | 25,000 | (Switzerland) Damian Ulrich (1) |
| 30 Jan | Sueno Classic | Turkey | 25,000 | (Germany) Christoph Günther (7) |
| 6 Feb | Gloria Classic | Turkey | 25,000 | (Germany) Max Kramer (3) |
| 16 Apr | Hofgut Scheibenhardt Classic | Germany | 20,000 | (Germany) Dennis Küpper (3) |
| 30 Apr | Sempachersee Classic | Switzerland | 20,000 | (Austria) Clemens Prader (1) |
| 7 May | Nová Amerika Classic | Czech Republic | 20,000 | (Germany) Marcel Haremza (6) |
| 16 May | Drei Thermen Golfresort Baden Württemberg Open | Germany | 30,000 | (Germany) Benjamin Ludwig (1) |
| 21 May | Augsburg Classic | Germany | 20,000 | (Germany) Richard Porter (4) |
| 29 May | Wörthsee Classic | Germany | 20,000 | (Germany) Daniel Froreich (1) |
| 11 Jun | Licher Classic | Germany | 20,000 | (Germany) Christoph Günther (8) |
| 25 Jun | Bad Griesbach Classic | Germany | 20,000 | (Denmark) Phillip Drost (1) |
| 1 Jul | Coburg Brose Open | Germany | 25,000 | (England) James Ruth (3) |
| 10 Jul | OTP Private Bank Central European Golf Classic | Germany | 20,000 | (Germany) Nicolas Meitinger (5) |
| 16 Jul | Bohemia Franzensbad Classic | Germany | 20,000 | (Germany) Nicolas Meitinger (6) |
| 30 Jul | Heidelberg Lobenfeld Classic | Germany | 20,000 | (Germany) Max Kramer (4) |
| 13 Aug | Harderwold Classic | Netherlands | 20,000 | (England) James Ruth (4) |
| 19 Aug | Preis des Hardenberg GolfResort | Germany | 30,000 | (England) James Ruth (5) |
| 27 Aug | Stolper Heide Classic | Germany | 20,000 | (Sweden) Fredrick Månsson (2) |
| 21 Sep | Schönbuch Open | Germany | 20,000 | (Germany) Dennis Küpper (4) |
| 5 Oct | JOB AG EPD Championship | Germany | 30,000 | (Germany) Tobias Dier (1) |

== Order of Merit ==
The Order of Merit was based on prize money won during the season, calculated in Euros. The top five players on the Order of Merit (not otherwise exempt) earned status to play on the 2009 Challenge Tour.

| Position | Player | Prize money (€) | Status earned |
|---|---|---|---|
| 1 | (England) James Ruth | 23,441 | Promoted to Challenge Tour |
| 2 | (Germany) Max Kramer | 23,008 | Promoted to Challenge Tour |
| 3 | (Germany) Nicolas Meitinger | 21,040 | Qualified for Challenge Tour (made cut in Q School) |
| 4 | (Germany) Christoph Günther | 18,801 | Promoted to Challenge Tour |
| 5 | (Germany) Dennis Küpper | 17,798 | Qualified for Challenge Tour (made cut in Q School) |
| 6 | (Germany) Daniel Froreich | 13,766 | Promoted to Challenge Tour |
| 7 | (Germany) Patrick Niederdrenk | 12,923 | Promoted to Challenge Tour |
| 8 | (Germany) Richard Porter | 11,967 | |
| 9 | (Germany) Marcel Haremza | 11,804 | |
| 10 | (Denmark) Kenneth Mortensen | 11,436 | |
