= 2010 Swedish Golf Tour =

Golf tour season

2010 Swedish Golf Tour season
- Duration: 20 May 2010 – 2 October 2010
- Number of official events: 14
- Order of Merit: (Sweden) Wilhelm Schauman

The 2010 Swedish Golf Tour, titled as the 2010 Nordea Tour for sponsorship reasons, was the 27th season of the Swedish Golf Tour, the main professional golf tour in Sweden since it was formed in 1984, with most tournaments being incorporated into the Nordic Golf League since 1999.

== Nordea title sponsorship ==
In October 2009, it was announced that the tour had signed a title sponsorship agreement with Nordea, being renamed as the Nordea Tour.

== Schedule ==
The following table lists official events during the 2010 season.

Date	Tournament	Location	Purse (SKr)	Winner (Note: The number in brackets after each winner's name is the number of Swedish Golf Tour events they had won up to and including that tournament. As most Swedish Golf Tour events are incorporated into the Nordic Golf League schedule, details of these wins are displayed there instead.)	Main tour (Note: NGL − Nordic Golf League.)
22 May	Willis Masters	Denmark	DKr 300,000	(Norway) Marius Thorp	NGL
29 May	Fredrik Jacobson Masters	Halland	250,000	(Sweden) Wilhelm Schauman	NGL
5 Jun	Söderby Masters	Uppland	425,000	(Sweden) Oskar Bergman	NGL
12 Jun	Sturup Park Masters	Skåne	450,000	(Sweden) Adrian Axelson	NGL
24 Jun	Nordea Masters	Norway	300,000	(Sweden) Marcus Palm	NGL
11 Jul	Gant Open	Finland	€40,000	(Sweden) Wilhelm Schauman	NGL
30 Jul	St Ibb Open	Skåne	300,000	(Sweden) Victor Almström	NGL
7 Aug	Gefle Open	Gästrikland	350,000	(Sweden) Björn Åkesson	NGL
14 Aug	Isaberg Open	Småland	300,000	(Sweden) Tony Edlund	NGL
21 Aug	SM Match	Uppland	250,000	(Sweden) Niklas Bruzelius	NGL
29 Aug	Landskrona Masters	Skåne	450,000	(Sweden) Joakim Lagergren	NGL
18 Sep	PEAB PGA Open	Skåne	400,000	(Sweden) Magnus Persson Atlevi	NGL
25 Sep	Krone Golf Tours Open	Denmark	DKr 250,000	(Sweden) Wilhelm Schauman	NGL
2 Oct	Helsingborg Golf Open	Skåne	450,000	(Sweden) Joakim Bäckström	NGL

== Order of Merit ==
The Order of Merit was titled as the Nordea Tour Ranking and was based on tournament results during the season, calculated using a points-based system.

Position	Player	Points
1	(Sweden) Wilhelm Schauman	276,330
2	(Sweden) Victor Almström	197,031
3	(Sweden) Björn Åkesson	185,727
4	(Sweden) Tony Edlund	146,139
5	(Sweden) Johan Bjerhag	145,291

== See also ==
- 2010 Danish Golf Tour
- 2010 Finnish Tour
- 2010 Swedish Golf Tour (women)
