= 2007 EPD Tour =

Golf tour season

2007 EPD Tour season
- Duration: 14 February 2007 – 6 October 2007
- Number of official events: 22
- Most wins: (Germany) Tino Schuster (5)
- Order of Merit: (Germany) Tino Schuster

The 2007 EPD Tour, titled as the 2007 Renault EPD Tour for sponsorship reasons, was the 11th season of the EPD Tour, a third-tier tour recognised by the European Tour.

== Schedule ==
The following table lists official events during the 2007 season.

Date	Tournament	Host country	Purse (€)	Winner (Note: The number in brackets after each winner's name is the number of EPD Tour events they had won up to and including that tournament. It is rare for someone to accumulate many wins on the EPD Tour as success at this level usually leads to promotion to the Challenge Tour.)
16 Feb	Oliva Nova Classic	Spain	25,000	(Denmark) Mark Schytter (2)
23 Feb	Real de Faula Classic	Spain	25,000	(Netherlands) Wil Besseling (1)
28 Feb	Mosa Trajectum Classic	Spain	25,000	(England) James Ruth (1)
4 Apr	Kempferhof Classic	France	17,500	(Netherlands) Niels Kraaij (1)
25 Apr	Paderborn Classic	Germany	17,500	(England) Lee Corfield (1)
9 May	Gut Winterbrock Classic	Germany	17,500	(Germany) Tino Schuster (3)
16 May	Haus Bey Classic	Germany	17,500	(Germany) Benjamin Schlichting (1)
24 May	Sybrook Classic	Netherlands	17,500	(Germany) Max Kramer (1)
31 May	Kassel German Classics	Germany	15,000	(Netherlands) Ruben Wechgelaer (1)
20 Jun	Licher Classic	Germany	17,500	(England) James Ruth (2)
27 Jun	Olympus Classic	Czech Republic	17,500	(Germany) Max Kramer (2)
3 Jul	Coburg Brose Open	Germany	26,000	(Germany) Tino Schuster (4)
10 Jul	Bad Griesbach Classic	Germany	20,000	(Germany) Tino Schuster (5)
25 Jul	Augsburg Classic	Germany	20,000	(Netherlands) Taco Remkes (1)
1 Aug	EPD Tour Central European Golf Classic	Germany	20,000	(Austria) Thomas Kogler (1)
22 Aug	Harderwold Classic	Netherlands	15,000	(Germany) Dennis Küpper (2)
29 Aug	Wörthsee Classic	Germany	17,500	(Germany) Tino Schuster (6)
4 Sep	Sierra Classic	Poland	17,500	(England) Lee Corfield (2)
9 Sep	Polish Open	Poland	30,000	(Netherlands) Taco Remkes (2)
23 Sep	Schönbuch Open	Germany	15,000	(Germany) Tobias Schwartzer (1)
29 Sep	Preis des Hardenberg GolfResort	Germany	15,000	(Germany) Tino Schuster (7)
6 Oct	JOB AG EPD Championship	Germany	20,000	(Germany) Christoph Günther (6)

== Order of Merit ==
The Order of Merit was based on prize money won during the season, calculated in Euros. The top five players on the Order of Merit earned status to play on the 2008 Challenge Tour.

Position	Player	Prize money (€)	Status earned
1	(Germany) Tino Schuster	25,287	Promoted to Challenge Tour
2	(Netherlands) Taco Remkes	21,322	Promoted to Challenge Tour
3	(Switzerland) Damian Ulrich	17,518	Promoted to Challenge Tour
4	(England) Lee Corfield	16,806	Promoted to Challenge Tour
5	(Netherlands) Wil Besseling	15,342	Promoted to Challenge Tour
6	(England) James Ruth	15,293	
7	(Germany) Max Kramer	14,923	
8	(Germany) Benjamin Schlichting	12,560	
9	(Scotland) Jay Taylor	11,390	
10	(England) Grant Jackson	11,316	
