= 2003 EPD Tour =

Golf tour season

2003 EPD Tour season
- Duration: 26 February 2003 – 14 September 2003
- Number of official events: 17
- Most wins: (England) Darren Leng (4)
- Order of Merit: (England) Darren Leng

The 2003 EPD Tour was the seventh season of the EPD Tour, a third-tier tour recognised by the European Tour.

== Schedule ==
The following table lists official events during the 2003 season.

Date	Tournament	Host country	Purse (€)	Winner (Note: The number in brackets after each winner's name is the number of EPD Tour events they had won up to and including that tournament. It is rare for someone to accumulate many wins on the EPD Tour as success at this level usually leads to promotion to the Challenge Tour.)
28 Feb	Oliva Nova Golf & Beach Resort	Spain	35,000	(England) Darren Leng (2)
16 Apr	Kempferhof Classic	France	20,000	(England) Darren Leng (3)
25 Apr	Jakobsberg Classic	Germany	20,000	(Netherlands) Joost Steenkamer (2)
6 May	Haus Bey Classic	Germany	15,000	(Scotland) Craig Miller (1)
13 May	Gleidingen Classic	Germany	16,500	(England) Darren Leng (4)
28 May	Baloise La Largue	France	17,500	(Scotland) Euan McIntosh (2)
3 Jun	Bodensee Classic	Germany	15,000	(Tunisia) Nabil Gharbi (1)
25 Jun	Licher Classic	Germany	17,500	(Germany) Matthias Ziegler (1)
1 Jul	Reichswald Classic	Germany	15,000	(Denmark) Søren Juul (1)
8 Jul	Hohenpahl Classic	Germany	15,000	(England) Mark Stevenson (1)
22 Jul	Sybrook Classic	Netherlands	15,000	(England) Darren Leng (5)
29 Jul	Winnerod Classic	Germany	15,000	(Germany) Christoph Günther (4)
5 Aug	Schärding Classic	Austria	17,500	(Germany) Christian Reimbold (1)
19 Aug	Habsberg Classic	Germany	17,500	(Scotland) Craig Miller (2)
31 Aug	Wallonia Pro-Am	Belgium	25,000	(Belgium) Laurent Richard (1)
14 Sep	Central European Development Open	Germany	50,000	(Scotland) Simon Dunn (1)

== Order of Merit ==
The Order of Merit was based on prize money won during the season, calculated in Euros. The top four players on the Order of Merit (not otherwise exempt) earned status to play on the 2004 Challenge Tour.

Position	Player	Prize money (€)	Status earned
1	(England) Darren Leng	18,208	Qualified for Challenge Tour (made cut in Q School)
2	(Germany) Jochen Lupprian	15,462	Promoted to Challenge Tour
3	(Germany) Christoph Günther	11,902	Promoted to Challenge Tour
4	(Scotland) Simon Dunn	9,357	Promoted to Challenge Tour
5	(Scotland) Craig Miller	9,215	Promoted to Challenge Tour
6	(Denmark) Søren Juul	9,188	
7	(Scotland) Euan McIntosh	9,185	
8	(Netherlands) Joost Steenkamer	8,825	
9	(United States) Peter Bronson	7,656	
10	(England) James Johnson	6,652	
