= 2011 Nordic Golf League =

Golf tour season

2011 Nordic Golf League season
- Duration: 1 March 2011 – 8 October 2011
- Number of official events: 26
- Most wins: (Sweden) Jens Dantorp (4)
- Order of Merit: (Sweden) Jens Dantorp

The 2011 Nordic Golf League was the 13th season of the Nordic Golf League, a third-tier tour recognised by the European Tour.

== Schedule ==
The following table lists official events during the 2011 season.

Date	Tournament	Host country	Purse	Winner (Note: The number in brackets after each winner's name is the number of Nordic Golf League events they had won up to and including that tournament. It is rare for someone to accumulate many wins on the Nordic Golf League as success at this level usually leads to promotion to the Challenge Tour.)
3 Mar	Backtee Spanish Open	Spain	€30,000	(Sweden) Anders Sjöstrand (4)
7 Mar	ECCO Spanish Open	Spain	€30,000	(Sweden) Joakim Lagergren (2)
11 Mar	Mediter Real Estate Masters	Spain	€30,000	(Sweden) Krister Eriksson (1)
1 May	PEAB PGA Grand Opening	Sweden	SKr 500,000	(Sweden) Steven Jeppesen (1)
6 May	JELD-WEN Masters	Denmark	DKr 250,000	(Sweden) David Palm (2)
13 May	Samsø Classic	Denmark	DKr 300,000	(Denmark) Knud Storgaard (4)
20 May	Danfoss Masters	Denmark	DKr 300,000	(Sweden) Joakim Bäckström (5)
28 May	PayEx Invitational	Sweden	SKr 400,000	(Sweden) Victor Almström (2)
4 Jun	Söderby Masters	Sweden	SKr 450,000	(Sweden) Mathias Johansson (1)
11 Jun	Sturup Park Masters	Sweden	SKr 450,000	(Sweden) Jens Dantorp (3)
18 Jun	Willis Masters	Denmark	DKr 300,000	(Denmark) Niklas Nørgaard (a) (1)
23 Jun	Nordea Open	Norway	SKr 350,000	(Sweden) Mattias Eliasson (3)
2 Jul	Mørk Masters	Norway	DKr 300,000	(Sweden) Kristoffer Broberg (1)
8 Jul	Katrineholm Open	Sweden	SKr 300,000	(Sweden) Joakim Rask (7)
16 Jul	Finnish Open	Finland	€60,000	(Denmark) Morten Ørum Madsen (1)
31 Jul	Gant Open	Finland	€40,000	(Finland) Toni Karjalainen (3)
5 Aug	Actona PGA Championship	Denmark	DKr 300,000	(Denmark) Morten Ørum Madsen (2)
13 Aug	Isaberg Open	Sweden	SKr 400,000	(Sweden) Johan Wahlqvist (2)
18 Aug	SM Match	Sweden	SKr 250,000	(Sweden) Niklas Bruzelius (4)
21 Aug	Gefle Open	Sweden	SKr 400,000	(Sweden) Steven Jeppesen (2)
28 Aug	Landskrona Masters	Sweden	SKr 450,000	(Sweden) Andreas Högberg (3)
9 Sep	Bravo Tours Open	Denmark	DKr 300,000	(Sweden) Jens Dantorp (4)
17 Sep	Telenor Masters	Sweden	SKr 400,000	(Sweden) Gustav Adell (3)
24 Sep	Golf Experten Open	Denmark	DKr 300,000	(Sweden) Jens Dantorp (5)
2 Oct	Nordea Tour Championship	Sweden	SKr 450,000	(Sweden) Felix Fihn (1)
8 Oct	Backtee Race to HimmerLand	Denmark	DKr 520,000	(Sweden) Jens Dantorp (6)

== Order of Merit ==
The Order of Merit was based on tournament results during the season, calculated using a points-based system. The top five players on the Order of Merit (not otherwise exempt) earned status to play on the 2012 Challenge Tour.

Position	Player	Points	Status earned
1	(Sweden) Jens Dantorp	61,167	Promoted to Challenge Tour
2	(Sweden) Kristoffer Broberg	40,523	Promoted to Challenge Tour
3	(Denmark) Morten Ørum Madsen	37,640	Qualified for Challenge Tour (made cut in Q School)
4	(Sweden) Steven Jeppesen	30,133	Qualified for Challenge Tour (made cut in Q School)
5	(Denmark) Joachim B. Hansen	29,262	Qualified for Challenge Tour (made cut in Q School)
6	(Sweden) Mattias Eliasson	28,630	Promoted to Challenge Tour
7	(Sweden) Joakim Rask	26,650	Promoted to Challenge Tour
8	(Sweden) Benny Ahlenbäck	23,155	Promoted to Challenge Tour
9	(Sweden) Felix Fihn	20,501	
10	(Sweden) Joakim Bäckström	19,769	

== See also ==
- 2011 Danish Golf Tour
- 2011 Finnish Tour
- 2011 Swedish Golf Tour
