= 2009 Nordic Golf League =

Golf tour season

2009 Nordic Golf League season
- Duration: 13 January 2009 – 21 October 2009
- Number of official events: 40
- Most wins: (Denmark) Lasse Jensen (3) (Denmark) Thorbjørn Olesen (3) (Finland) Thomas Sundström (3)
- Order of Merit: (Denmark) Lasse Jensen

The 2009 Nordic Golf League was the 11th season of the Nordic Golf League, a third-tier tour recognised by the European Tour.

== Schedule ==
The following table lists official events during the 2009 season.

Date	Tournament	Host country	Purse	Winner (Note: The number in brackets after each winner's name is the number of Nordic Golf League events they had won up to and including that tournament. It is rare for someone to accumulate many wins on the Nordic Golf League as success at this level usually leads to promotion to the Challenge Tour.)	Other tours (Note: CHA − Challenge Tour; EPD − EPD Tour; Hi5 − Hi5 Pro Tour.)
15 Jan	Nations Cup	Spain	€15,000	(England) Sean Elliott (n/a)	Hi5
22 Jan	Oliva Nova Open	Spain	€15,000	(Denmark) Thorbjørn Olesen (2)	Hi5
29 Jan	Open de Quara	Spain	€15,000	(Denmark) Thorbjørn Olesen (3)	Hi5
12 Feb	Valle del Este	Spain	€15,000	(England) Peter Finch (n/a)	Hi5
19 Feb	El Valle - Polaris World	Spain	€22,500	(Norway) Marius Thorp (3)	Hi5
26 Feb	Hacienda Riquelme Polaris World Open	Spain	€22,500	(Denmark) Peter Møller Hansen (2)	Hi5
12 Mar	Villaitana Open	Spain	€17,500	(Spain) Carlos García Simarro (n/a)	Hi5
19 Mar	Altorreal European Open	Spain	€15,000	(Sweden) Niklas Bruzelius (2)	Hi5
2 Apr	La Rioja Alta	Spain	€15,000	(Germany) John Blanks (n/a)	Hi5
9 Apr	Sojuela Golf la Rioja	Spain	€30,000	(Finland) Thomas Sundström (4)	Hi5
1 May	St Ibb Open	Sweden	SKr 300,000	(Sweden) Jens Dantorp (2)	
10 May	Danfoss Masters	Denmark	DKr 300,000	(Sweden) Mattias Eliasson (1)	
16 May	Sturup Park Masters	Sweden	SKr 350,000	(Sweden) Wilhelm Schauman (1)	
23 May	Willis Masters	Denmark	DKr 300,000	(Norway) Peter Kaensche (1)	
30 May	FGT Opening	Finland	€15,000	(Finland) Thomas Sundström (5)	
30 May	Fredrik Jacobson Masters	Sweden	SKr 225,000	(Sweden) Jonas Enander-Hedin (2)	
6 Jun	Söderby Masters	Sweden	SKr 425,000	(Sweden) Joakim Rask (6)	
12 Jun	FGT II	Finland	€15,000	(Finland) Toni Karjalainen (2)	
13 Jun	Salem Becker Open	Sweden	SKr 200,000	(Sweden) Andreas Hedlund (1)	
21 Jun	Unibake Masters	Denmark	DKr 300,000	(Sweden) Mattias Eliasson (2)	
21 Jun	Galvin Green Tour I	Norway	€15,000	(Norway) Paul Nilbrink (1)	
12 Jul	Gant Open	Finland	SKr 550,000	(Sweden) Anders Sjöstrand (2)	
29 Jul	Green Eagle Classic	Germany	€30,000	(Germany) Constantin Schwierz (n/a)	EPD
2 Aug	Capitals Masters	Lithuania	€20,000	(Denmark) Lasse Jensen (1)	
15 Aug	JELD-WEN Masters	Denmark	DKr 300,000	(Denmark) Thorbjørn Olesen (4)	
15 Aug	Pensum Invitational	Sweden	SKr 300,000	(Sweden) Fredrik Hammarberg (2)	
22 Aug	SM Match	Sweden	SKr 200,000	(Sweden) Tony Edlund (4)	
30 Aug	FGT IV	Finland	€15,000	(Finland) Tapio Pulkkanen (a) (1)	
30 Aug	Landskrona Masters	Sweden	SKr 400,000	(Denmark) Lasse Jensen (2)	
6 Sep	Ledreborg Danish PGA Championship	Denmark	DKr 300,000	(Denmark) Lasse Jensen (3)	
6 Sep	Galvin Green Tour II	Norway	€15,000	(Norway) Paul Nilbrink (2)	
12 Sep	Kinnaborg Open	Sweden	SKr 200,000	(Sweden) Niklas Bruzelius (3)	
13 Sep	FGT V	Finland	€15,000	(Finland) Erik Stenman (4)	
19 Sep	FGT Final	Finland	€20,000	(Finland) Thomas Sundström (6)	
19 Sep	Västerås Mälarstaden Open	Sweden	SKr 200,000	(Sweden) Mårten Milling (a) (1)	
26 Sep	PGA of Sweden National Open	Sweden	SKr 275,000	(Sweden) Alexander Björk (1)	
4 Oct	ECCO Tour Championship	Denmark	€180,000	(Portugal) José-Filipe Lima (n/a)	CHA
10 Oct	Volkswagen Kallfors Open	Sweden	SKr 250,000	(Sweden) Wilhelm Schauman (2)	
21 Oct	ECCO Tour Qualification	Denmark	DKr 100,000	(Sweden) Anders Sjöstrand (3)	
25 Oct	Backtee Race to HimmerLand	Denmark	€100,000	(Sweden) Fredrik Henge (1)	

=== Unofficial events ===
The following events were sanctioned by the Nordic Golf League, but did not carry official money, nor were wins official.

Date	Tournament	Host country	Purse	Winner
10 Dec	Samanah Masters	Morocco	€70,000	(England) Daniel Brooks

== Order of Merit ==
The Order of Merit was based on tournament results during the season, calculated using a points-based system. The top five players on the Order of Merit (not otherwise exempt) earned status to play on the 2010 Challenge Tour.

Position	Player	Points	Status earned
1	(Denmark) Lasse Jensen	32,396	Promoted to Challenge Tour
2	(Sweden) Mattias Eliasson	30,327	Promoted to Challenge Tour
3	(Sweden) Anders Sjöstrand	27,580	Promoted to Challenge Tour
4	(Denmark) Thorbjørn Olesen	26,036	Qualified for Challenge Tour (made cut in Q School)
5	(Sweden) Fredrik Henge	24,484	Promoted to Challenge Tour
6	(Sweden) Niklas Bruzelius	23,000	Promoted to Challenge Tour
7	(Sweden) Joakim Rask	22,636	
8	(Sweden) Wilhelm Schauman	20,162	
9	(Sweden) Tony Edlund	19,351	
10	(Finland) Thomas Sundström	16,767	

== See also ==
- 2009 Danish Golf Tour
- 2009 Swedish Golf Tour
