= Elis Svärd =

Swedish professional golfer (1996–2022)

Personal information
- Full name: Mats Elis Svärd
- Nationality: Sweden
- Born: 8 July 1996 Södertälje, Sweden
- Died: 28 January 2022 (aged 25)

Career
- Sport: Golf
- College: California State University, Monterey Bay (2016–2020); Ohio State University (2020–2021)
- Turned professional: 2021
- Current tour: Nordic Golf League
- Professional wins: 1

Achievements and awards
- California Collegiate Athletic Association Freshman of the Year: 2017
- California Collegiate Athletic Association Player of the Year: 2018, 2019

Elis Svärd (8 July 1996 – 28 January 2022) was a Swedish professional golfer.

== Early life and amateur career ==
Svärd was born in Södertälje in 1996 and represented Salem Golf Club. He had success as a junior golfer and won a handful of titles on the Skandia Tour.

After he graduated from the Riksidrottsgymnasiet Golf Program at Celsius High School in Uppsala in 2016, Svärd played college golf at California State University, Monterey Bay between 2016 and 2020. He won four tournaments and was California Collegiate Athletic Association Rookie of the Year in 2017 and Golfer of the Year in 2018 and 2019. He graduated in May 2020 with a degree in Business Administration and a minor in Accounting.

Svärd arguably was the greatest golfer in CSUMB history, earning All-American honors his sophomore through senior seasons while finishing his Otter career with the most NCAA Division II tournament wins (4) and lowest stroke average (71.19) in school history. He finished No. 9 overall in Golfstat individual rankings for 2019–20.

Between 2020 and 2021 Svärd was a graduate student at Ohio State University, earning both his MBA and OSU Scholar-Athlete honors. In joining the Ohio State Buckeyes men's golf team, he followed in the footsteps of Tom Nieporte, Robert Jones and Jack Nicklaus. Svärd was a first team All-American and one of five finalists for the GCAA DII Jack Nicklaus Award.

== Professional career ==
Svärd turned professional in the summer of 2021 and joined the Nordic Golf League, where he won the 2021 Thisted Forsikring Championship in Ålborg, Denmark. Svärd was four strokes behind Peter Launer Bæk at the turn, but was able to win due to a strong finish. The title race came down to the very last hole where Svärd made an 8-meter putt for birdie and Bæk a bogey after visiting a hazard.

Following the win Svärd rose to 860th in the Official World Golf Ranking.

== Death ==
Svärd died on 28 January 2022, with his death being announced by the Swedish Golf Federation. He was 25, and died from a sudden and unexpected case of illness.

== Amateur wins ==
- 2011 Skandia Tour Regional #5 – Stockholm
- 2012 Skandia Tour Regional #3 – Stockholm Södra
- 2014 Gräppås Junior Open
- 2015 Drottningholms 36:an
- 2016 Salem PING Junior Open, Skandia Tour Elit #2
- 2017 CSUSM Fujikura Invitational
- 2018 CSUSM Fujikura Invitational, CCAA Championship
- 2019 Dennis Rose Invitational
- 2020 Stockholm Golf Club Amateur Open, HNS Amateur Open

== Professional wins (1) ==
=== Nordic Golf League wins (1) ===
No.	Date	Tournament	Winning score	Margin of victory	Runner-up
1	27 Aug 2021	Thisted Forsikring Championship	−4 (74-66-69=209)	1 stroke	(Denmark) Peter Launer Bæk
