= Mattias Eliasson =

Swedish professional golfer

Personal information
- Full name: Mattias Daniel Eliasson
- Nationality: Sweden
- Born: 2 April 1975 (age 51) Borås, Sweden
- Height: 1.83 m (6 ft 0 in)
- Weight: 80 kg (180 lb; 13 st)
- Spouse: Jenny Eliasson

Career
- Sport: Golf
- Turned professional: 1997
- Former tours: European Tour; Challenge Tour
- Professional wins: 3

Best results in major championships
- Masters Tournament: DNP
- PGA Championship: DNP
- U.S. Open: DNP
- The Open Championship: CUT: 2002, 2007

Mattias Daniel Eliasson (born 2 April 1975) is a Swedish professional golfer.

== Career ==
Eliasson turned professional in 1997. He played on the second-tier Challenge Tour from 1998 to 2004, with three runners-up finishes, in 1998, 1999, and 2004. During this period he also was successful at qualifying school on three occasions, allowing him to play limited events on the main European Tour in 2000, 2002, and 2003.

In 2004 Eliasson finished in eleventh place on the Challenge Tour rankings, which gave him full promotion to the European Tour. He went on to play at that level for three seasons, from 2005 to 2007.

He then suffered a slump in form, however, and has played only sporadically on either tour since 2008. Nonetheless, he has recorded three wins on the third-tier Nordic League in that time.

Eliasson's best result on the European Tour was a third place in the 2006 Open de España. 2006 was also his best season at the highest level, as he finished 75th in the Order of Merit, with five top-ten finishes in his first seven tournaments.

== Professional wins (3) ==
=== Nordic Golf League wins (3) ===
No.	Date	Tournament	Winning score	Margin of victory	Runner(s)-up
1	10 May 2009	Danfoss Masters	−3 (70-70-63=213)	2 strokes	(Denmark) Anders Schmidt Hansen, (Denmark) Kasper Linnet Jørgensen
2	21 Jun 2009	Unibake Masters	−9 (65-63-67=195)	3 strokes	(Denmark) Søren Juul
3	23 Jun 2011	Nordea Open	−16 (65-66-63=194)	Playoff	(Norway) Paul Nilbrink

== Playoff record ==
Challenge Tour playoff record (0–1)

No.	Year	Tournament	Opponent	Result
1	2004	Bouygues Telecom Grand Final	(Scotland) David Drysdale	Lost to birdie on first extra hole

== Results in major championships ==
Tournament	2002	2003	2004	2005	2006	2007
The Open Championship	CUT					CUT

Note: Eliasson only played in The Open Championship.

Did not play

CUT = missed the half-way cut

== Team appearances ==
Amateur

- European Amateur Team Championship (representing Sweden): 1995, 1997
- European Youths' Team Championship (representing Sweden): 1996

== See also ==
- 2005 European Tour Qualifying School graduates
