= 2016 Arnold Palmer Cup =

Team golf competition in England

- Dates: 24–26 June 2016
- Venue: Formby Golf Club
- Location: Formby, Merseyside, England
(Europe)	18½	11½	(United States)
- Europe wins the Arnold Palmer Cup

The 2016 Arnold Palmer Cup was held from 24 to 26 June 2016 at Formby Golf Club in Formby, Merseyside, England. Europe won 18 1/2 to 11 1/2.

== Format ==
On Friday, there were five matches of foursomes in the morning, followed by five four-ball matches in the afternoon. Ten singles matches were played on Saturday, and ten more on Sunday. In all, 30 matches were played.

Each of the 30 matches was worth one point in the larger team competition. If a match was all square after the 18th hole, each side earned half a point toward their team total. The team that accumulated at least 15 1/2 points won the competition.

== Teams ==
Ten college golfers from the United States and Europe participated in the event plus a non-playing head coach and assistant coach for each team.

United States
Name	Class	College	Qualification method
Mike Cook	non-playing head coach		
John Handrigan	non-playing assistant coach		
Charlie Danielson	Sr.	Illinois	2nd in Arnold Palmer Cup Ranking
Zach Wright	Sr.	LSU	3rd in Arnold Palmer Cup Ranking
Rico Hoey	Jr.	Southern Cal	4th in Arnold Palmer Cup Ranking
Michael Johnson	Sr.	Auburn	5th in Arnold Palmer Cup Ranking
Nahum Mendoza III	Jr.	San Diego State	6th in Arnold Palmer Cup Ranking
Derek Bard	Jr.	Virginia	Committee pick
Will Zalatoris	So.	Wake Forest	Committee pick
Alistair Docherty	Sr.	Chico State	Committee pick, non-Division I
Will Gordon	Fr.	Vanderbilt	Coach's pick
Doug Ghim	So.	Texas	replaced Maverick McNealy

Europe
Name	Country	Class	College	Qualification method
Janice Moodie	Scotland	non-playing head coach		
Dean Robertson	Scotland	non-playing assistant coach		
Sam Horsfield	England	Fr.	Florida	1st in Arnold Palmer Cup Ranking
Matthias Schwab	Austria	Jr.	Vanderbilt	2nd in Arnold Palmer Cup Ranking
Adrian Meronk	Poland	Sr.	East Tennessee State	3rd in Arnold Palmer Cup Ranking
Lars van Meijel	Netherlands	Jr.	Memphis	4th in Arnold Palmer Cup Ranking
Robin Petersson	Sweden	Sr.	Augusta	5th in Arnold Palmer Cup Ranking
David Boote	Wales	Sr.	Stanford	6th in Arnold Palmer Cup Ranking
Stuart Grehan	Ireland	So.	Maynooth	Committee pick
Antoine Rozner	France	Sr.	UMKC	Committee pick
Mathias Eggenberger	Switzerland	Sr.	Stirling	Winner of R&A Foundation Scholars Tournament
Robin Sciot-Siegrist	France	Sr.	Louisville	Coach's pick

== Friday's matches ==
=== Morning foursomes ===
	Results
Boote/Horsfield	halved	Docherty/Gordon
Meronk/Schwab	(Europe) 1 up	Ghim/Zalatoris
Rozner/Sciot-Siegrist	(Europe) 3 & 2	Hoey/Mendoza
Grehan/van Meijel	(Europe) 2 & 1	Bard/Johnson
Eggenberger/Petersson	halved	Danielson/Wright
4	Foursomes	1
4	Overall	1

=== Afternoon four-ball ===
	Results
Boote/Meronk	(Europe) 4 & 2	Bard/Johnson
Horsfield/Schwab	(United States) 2 & 1	Ghim/Zalatoris
Rozner/Sciot-Siegrist	(Europe) 1 up	Docherty/Gordon
Eggenberger/Petersson	(United States) 1 up	Hoey/Mendoza
Grehan/van Meijel	(United States) 4 & 2	Danielson/Wright
2	Four-ball	3
6	Overall	4

== Saturday's singles matches ==
	Results
Antoine Rozner	(Europe) 5 & 4	Will Gordon
Adrian Meronk	halved	Alistair Docherty
Robin Petersson	(Europe) 6 & 5	Doug Ghim
Sam Horsfield	(Europe) 2 up	Will Zalatoris
Matthias Schwab	(United States) 3 & 2	Nahum Mendoza III
David Boote	(Europe) 4 & 3	Michael Johnson
Lars van Meijel	(United States) 2 & 1	Rico Hoey
Robin Sciot-Siegrist	(Europe) 2 & 1	Derek Bard
Mathias Eggenberger	halved	Zach Wright
Stuart Grehan	(Europe) 2 & 1	Charlie Danielson
7	Singles	3
13	Overall	7

== Sunday's singles matches ==
	Results
Antoine Rozner	(Europe) 1 up	Nahum Mendoza III
Sam Horsfield	(United States) 2 up	Rico Hoey
Adrian Meronk	halved	Alistair Docherty
Robin Petersson	(United States) 3 & 1	Zach Wright
David Boote	(United States) 1 up	Charlie Danielson
Mathias Eggenberger	(Europe) 1 up	Will Zalatoris
Matthias Schwab	(Europe) 2 & 1	Doug Ghim
Robin Sciot-Siegrist	(Europe) 1 up	Will Gordon
Lars van Meijel	halved	Derek Bard
Stuart Grehan	halved	Michael Johnson
5 1/2	Singles	4 1/2
18 1/2	Overall	11 1/2

== Michael Carter award ==
The Michael Carter Award winners were Robin Petersson and Charlie Danielson.
