= Wilhelm Schauman (golfer) =

Swedish professional golfer (born 1979)

Personal information
- Nickname: Ville
- Nationality: Sweden
- Born: 26 November 1979 (age 46) Danderyd, Sweden
- Height: 1.88 m (6 ft 2 in)

Career
- Sport: Golf
- College: University of Minnesota
- Turned professional: 2004
- Former tours: European Tour; Challenge Tour; Nordic Golf League; Swedish Golf Tour; NGA Hooters Tour
- Professional wins: 6

Best results in major championships
- Masters Tournament: DNP
- PGA Championship: DNP
- U.S. Open: DNP
- The Open Championship: CUT: 2005

Achievements and awards
- Swedish Golf Tour Order of Merit winner: 2010
- Nordic Golf League Order of Merit winner: 2010

Wilhelm Schauman (born 26 November 1979) is a Swedish professional golfer and former European Tour player.

== Amateur career ==
Schauman attended University of Minnesota 1999–2003, where he was part of the Minnesota Golden Gophers men's golf team that won the 2002 NCAA Division I men's golf championship. As a sophomore, he won two tournaments back-to-back and was named All-American. He won the 2003 Palmer Cup with the European team against the American team.

He tied for 4th at the 2002 Volvo Finnish Open, a Challenge Tour event, three strokes behind winner Thomas Nørret.

Schauman won bronze with the Sweden national team at the 2003 European Amateur Team Championship in the Netherlands, alongside Kalle Edberg, Per Nilsson, Steven Jeppesen, Niklas Lemke and Alex Norén.

== Professional career ==
Schauman turned professional in 2004 and joined the NGA Hooters Tour, where he won an event in Sikeston, Missouri. He was an alternate in the 2004 Scandinavian Masters at Barsebäck Golf & Country Club, only securing a spot on the Monday of the tournament after Camilo Villegas dropped out. After rounds of 68 and 67, he sat in second place on the leaderboard at the halfway stage, and played the third round alongside leader and eventual winner Luke Donald, before finishing tied 24th following a final round 75.

Schauman qualified at Canoe Brooks, New Jersey, for the 2005 Open Championship but did end up not making the cut in the 134th Open, held at Old Course at St Andrews, Scotland.

Schauman earned his European Tour card for the 2006 season through Q School. His career best performance on the tour ended up being his tie for 11th in the 2005 Scandinavian Masters at Kungsängen Golf Club near Stockholm.

In 2009, he joined the Nordic Golf League where he recorded five wins over two seasons and topped the 2010 Order of Merit ahead of Björn Åkesson, to earn a return to the Challenge Tour.

== Broadcast career ==
In 2012, Schauman became a golf broadcaster at Viasat Golf, and joined C More Sport in 2015 to host their PGA Tour coverage.

== Amateur wins ==
- 2000 PSINet Collegiate Invitational, Wolverine Invitational

== Professional wins (6) ==
=== Nordic Golf League wins (5) ===
No.	Date	Tournament	Winning score	Margin of victory	Runner(s)-up
1	16 May 2009	Sturup Park Masters	−4 (71-71-70=212)	Playoff	(Denmark) Thorbjørn Olesen
2	10 Oct 2009	Volkswagen Kallfors Open	−9 (70-67-70=207)	4 strokes	(Sweden) Niklas Bruzelius, (Sweden) Joakim Rask
3	29 May 2010	Fredrik Jacobson Masters	−6 (71-71-68=210)	1 stroke	(Sweden) Jeff Karlsson
4	11 Jul 2010	Gant Open	−13 (68-67-65=200)	4 strokes	(Sweden) Johan Bjerhag, (Sweden) Kristoffer Broberg
5	25 Sep 2010	Krone Golf Tours Open	−13 (66-67-70=203)	1 stroke	(Denmark) Thomas Nørret

=== NGA Hooters Tour wins (1) ===
No.	Date	Tournament	Winning score	Margin of victory	Runner-up
1	18 Jul 2004	Health Facilities Rehab Classic	−21 (65-69-66-67=267)	1 stroke	(United States) Sean Dougherty

== Results in major championships ==
Note: Schauman only played in The Open Championship.

Tournament	2005
The Open Championship	CUT

CUT = missed the half-way cut

== Team appearances ==
Amateur

- Eisenhower Trophy (representing Sweden): 2002
- Palmer Cup (representing Europe): 2003 (winners)
- European Amateur Team Championship (representing Sweden): 2001, 2003

== See also ==
- 2005 European Tour Qualifying School graduates
