= Robin Petersson =

Swedish professional golfer

Personal information
- Full name: Jan Olle Robin Petersson
- Nationality: Sweden
- Born: 12 May 1992 (age 34) Helsingborg, Sweden
- Height: 5 ft 8 in (173 cm)
- Weight: 190 lb (86 kg)

Career
- Sport: Golf
- College: Augusta University
- Turned professional: 2017
- Current tour: Challenge Tour
- Former tours: Nordic Golf League; Swedish Golf Tour
- Professional wins: 6

Achievements and awards
- Mid-Eastern Athletic Conference Player of the Year: 2016
- Michael Carter Award: 2016
- PGA of Sweden Future Fund Award: 2020

Robin Petersson (born 12 May 1992) is a Swedish professional golfer and Challenge Tour player. He tied for 3rd at the 2022 Cazoo Classic, a European Tour event, and was runner-up at the 2025 Italian Challenge Open.

== Amateur career ==
Petersson started playing golf at 11 and won several titles on the junior circuits in Sweden, including the 2013 PGA Junior Open. He appeared for the National Team at the 2016 Eisenhower Trophy in Mexico and the 2016 European Amateur Team Championship at Golf de Chantilly in France, securing the silver medal after they lost the final 2–5 to a Scottish team that included Grant Forrest, Craig Howie, Connor Syme and Robert MacIntyre.

Representing Europe, he won the 2016 Bonallack Trophy against Asia/Pacific and tied the 2016 St Andrews Trophy against Great Britain and Ireland.

Petersson shot a second-best opening round of 65 to advance to match play at the 2016 U.S. Amateur at Oakland Hills Country Club, where he lost to Jimmy Stanger.

In 2016, Petersson reached a World Amateur Golf Ranking of 24, making him his country's best-ranked male amateur. For the year his match play record in team competition stood at 10-3-2 (W-L-D).

== College career ==
Petersson attended Augusta University from 2011 to 2016, and excelled with the Augusta Jaguars men's golf team. He had three individual wins in his senior season and was ranked 29th nationally by Golfstat. He represented Team Europe at the 2016 Arnold Palmer Cup alongside Sam Horsfield, Adrian Meronk and Antoine Rozner. He beat Doug Ghim 6 & 5 in singles to help win the cup for Europe, and received the Michael Carter Award.

He was named All-America Scholar in 2015 and Mid-Eastern Athletic Conference Player of the Year in 2016 as he won the Mid-Eastern Athletic Conference Championship for a second time, and received All-American honors.

== Professional career ==
Petersson turned professional in January 2017 and joined the Nordic Golf League. He earned status for the 2020 Challenge Tour at Qualifying School, and his best finish in his rookie season was a tie for 5th at the Challenge Tour Grand Final, two strokes behind winner Ondřej Lieser.

In 2022, he tied for 3rd at the Cazoo Classic, a European Tour event in England, two strokes behind winner Richie Ramsay, and a few weeks later he finish tied 10th at the ISPS Handa World Invitational in Northern Ireland.

Petersson was runner-up at the 2025 Italian Challenge Open alongside his compatriot Christofer Rahm, two strokes behind J. C. Ritchie.

== Amateur wins ==
- 2008 Skandia Tour Riks #6 - Skåne
- 2009 Skandia Tour Elit #1
- 2010 Götenehus Short Game Masters, Skandia Tour Riks #7 - Skåne
- 2011 Götenehus Short Game Masters
- 2012 PGA Junior Open
- 2015 Mid-Eastern Athletic Conference Championship, Kiawah Classic, NC State Wolfpack Intercollegiate
- 2016 Mid-Eastern Athletic Conference Championship

== Professional wins (6) ==
=== Nordic Golf League wins (1) ===
| No. | Date | Tournament | Winning score | Margin of victory | Runner-up |
|---|---|---|---|---|---|
| 1 | 14 Aug 2020 | Landeryd Masters | −21 (67-62-66=195) | 3 strokes | (Denmark) Marcus Helligkilde |

=== Swedish Future Series wins (2) ===
| No. | Date | Tournament | Winning score | Margin of victory | Runner-up |
|---|---|---|---|---|---|
| 1 | 13 Jul 2015 | Uppsala Open (as an amateur) | −7 (72-65=137) | Playoff | (Sweden) Christian Modin |
| 2 | 9 Jul 2018 | Saltsjöbadskannan | −4 (65-75=140) | 2 strokes | (Sweden) Nisse Ström |

=== Other wins (3) ===
- 2013 Guldpokalen (as an amateur), Invigningspokalen (as an amateur)
- 2014 Karolinercupen (as an amateur)

== Team appearances ==
Amateur

- St Andrews Trophy (representing Continental Europe): 2016 (tie)
- Bonallack Trophy (representing Europe): 2016 (winners)
- Arnold Palmer Cup (representing Europe): 2016 (winners)
- Eisenhower Trophy (representing Sweden): 2016
- European Amateur Team Championship (representing Sweden): 2016
