= Ross Bain =

Scottish golfer

Personal information
- Nationality: Scotland
- Born: 25 November 1975 (age 50)
- Height: 5 ft 11 in (1.80 m)
- Weight: 182 lb (83 kg; 13.0 st)

Career
- Sport: Golf
- College: University of North Carolina
- Turned professional: 1998
- Current tour: Asian Tour
- Former tour: Challenge Tour
- Professional wins: 1

Best results in major championships
- Masters Tournament: DNP
- PGA Championship: DNP
- U.S. Open: DNP
- The Open Championship: T45: 2007

Ross Bain (born 25 November 1975) is a Scottish professional golfer.

== Amateur career ==
Bain played college golf in the United States at the University of North Carolina at Chapel Hill.

== Professional career ==
In 1998, Bain turned professional. He spent one unsuccessful season on the Challenge Tour before relocating to Asia. He joined the Asian Tour for 1999, and established himself on tour in 2001, finishing runner-up behind Thongchai Jaidee in the Wills Indian Open.

In 2007, Bain played in his first major at the 2007 Open Championship. He made the cut and finished as low Scot at T45.

In 2011, Bain enjoyed his most successful season to date on the Asian Tour, finishing 38th in the Order of Merit. It was the first time he had finished in the top 60, who automatically regain their cards, since 2001.

== Professional wins (1) ==
=== EPD Tour wins (1) ===
No.	Date	Tournament	Winning score	Margin of victory	Runner-up
1	6 Jul 2004	Gut Neuenhof Open	−6 (70-70-67=207)	2 strokes	(Germany) Philipp Oster

== Results in major championships ==
Tournament	2007
The Open Championship	T45

Note: Bain only played in The Open Championship.
"T" = tied
