= Mikael Lindberg =

Swedish professional golfer (born 1993)

Personal information
- Full name: Mikael Johan Lindberg
- Nationality: Sweden
- Born: 12 January 1993 (age 33)

Career
- Sport: Golf
- Turned professional: 2013
- Current tour: European Tour
- Former tours: Challenge Tour; Nordic Golf League
- Professional wins: 9

Number of wins by tour
- European Tour: 1
- Sunshine Tour: 1
- Challenge Tour: 2
- Other: 6

Best results in major championships
- Masters Tournament: DNP
- PGA Championship: T55: 2026
- U.S. Open: DNP
- The Open Championship: DNP

Achievements and awards
- Swedish Golf Tour Order of Merit winner: 2020
- Nordic Golf League Order of Merit winner: 2020

Mikael Johan Lindberg (born 12 January 1993) is a Swedish professional golfer and European Tour player. He won the 2024 Cape Town Open and 2026 Turkish Airlines Open.

== Professional career ==
Lindberg turned professional in 2013 and joined the Nordic Golf League. He recorded his maiden professional victory at the 2016 Trummenäs Open. In 2019 he won the Tour Final in Estonia.

His breakthrough season was 2020 when he won 4 tournaments and topped the Nordic Golf League Order of Merit, to graduate to the Challenge Tour.

=== Challenge Tour ===
On the Challenge Tour he was in contention in his second start, finishing tied for third at the 2021 Bain's Whisky Cape Town Open, one stroke behind J. C. Ritchie and Jacques Blaauw. The finish propelled him to 250th on the Official World Golf Ranking.

In 2022, Lindberg finished third at the Challenge de España, before shooting a closing five under par round of 66 to win the Indoor Golf Group Challenge three strokes ahead of Denmark's Nicolai Tinning, Englishman Steven Tiley and France's Robin Sciot-Siegrist. The following week he was runner-up at the B-NL Challenge Trophy, one stroke behind Alexander Knappe.

Lindberg finished 5th in the 2022 Challenge Tour rankings to graduate to the European Tour for 2023.

=== European Tour ===
On the European Tour, Lindberg recorded two top-5 finishes in 2025 at the Danish Golf Championship and Alfred Dunhill Links Championship.

In 2026, he finished solo 3rd at the Volvo China Open before securing his maiden title at the Turkish Airlines Open. With the win, he topped the rankings for the Asian Swing, to earn a start at the 2026 PGA Championship. He rose to 129th in the world rankings.

== Amateur wins ==
- 2007 Skandia Tour Distrikt #1
- 2009 Skandia Tour Regional #5
- 2011 Skandia Tour Elit Pojkar #5, Viksjö Junior Open, Junior Masters Invitational, Alex Norén Junior Open
- 2012 Stocholm District Championship

== Professional wins (9) ==
=== European Tour wins (1) ===
| No. | Date | Tournament | Winning score | Margin of victory | Runners-up |
|---|---|---|---|---|---|
| 1 | 3 May 2026 | Turkish Airlines Open | −10 (66-73-70-69=278) | 2 strokes | (Italy) Guido Migliozzi, (Portugal) Daniel Rodrigues |

=== Challenge Tour wins (2) ===
| No. | Date | Tournament | Winning score | Margin of victory | Runner(s)-up |
|---|---|---|---|---|---|
| 1 | 28 Aug 2022 | Indoor Golf Group Challenge | −17 (68-62-66=196) (Note: Shortened to 54 holes due to weather.) | 3 strokes | (France) Robin Sciot-Siegrist, (England) Steven Tiley, (Denmark) Nicolai Tinning |
| 2 | 11 Feb 2024 | Bain's Whisky Cape Town Open^{1} | −16 (70-70-65-67=272) | Playoff | (South Africa) Ryan van Velzen |

^{1}Co-sanctioned by the Sunshine Tour

Challenge Tour playoff record (1–0)

| No. | Year | Tournament | Opponent | Result |
|---|---|---|---|---|
| 1 | 2024 | Bain's Whisky Cape Town Open | (South Africa) Ryan van Velzen | Won with birdie on second extra hole |

=== Nordic Golf League wins (5) ===
| No. | Date | Tournament | Winning score | Margin of victory | Runner(s)-up |
|---|---|---|---|---|---|
| 1 | 28 May 2016 | Trummenäs Open | −10 (69-68-69=206) | Playoff | (Sweden) Oliver Lindell |
| 2 | 12 Oct 2019 | Tour Final | −18 (62-66-70=198) | 2 strokes | (Sweden) Björn Hellgren, (Denmark) Niklas Nørgaard |
| 3 | 1 Mar 2020 | Lumine Lakes Open | −10 (69-66-68=203) | Playoff | (Sweden) Per Längfors |
| 4 | 7 Aug 2020 | Thisted Forsikring Championship | −13 (64-67=131) | 2 strokes | (Denmark) Jeppe Huldahl, (Denmark) Frederik Kjettrup (a), (Finland) Lauri Ruuska |
| 5 | 28 Sep 2020 | Ledreborg Palace Golf Masters | −16 (67-65-68=200) | 3 strokes | (Finland) Lauri Ruuska, (Sweden) Anton Wilbertsson |

=== Swedish Golf Tour wins (1) ===
| No. | Date | Tournament | Winning score | Margin of victory | Runner-up |
|---|---|---|---|---|---|
| 1 | 24 Jul 2020 | Stockholm Trophy | −7 (71-66-66=203) | 3 strokes | (Sweden) Charlie Lindh |

== Results in major championships ==
| Tournament | 2026 |
|---|---|
| Masters Tournament | |
| PGA Championship | T55 |
| U.S. Open | |
| The Open Championship | |

Did not play

"T" = tied

== See also ==
- 2022 Challenge Tour graduates
- 2024 Challenge Tour graduates
