= Jeppe Huldahl =

Danish professional golfer (born 1982)

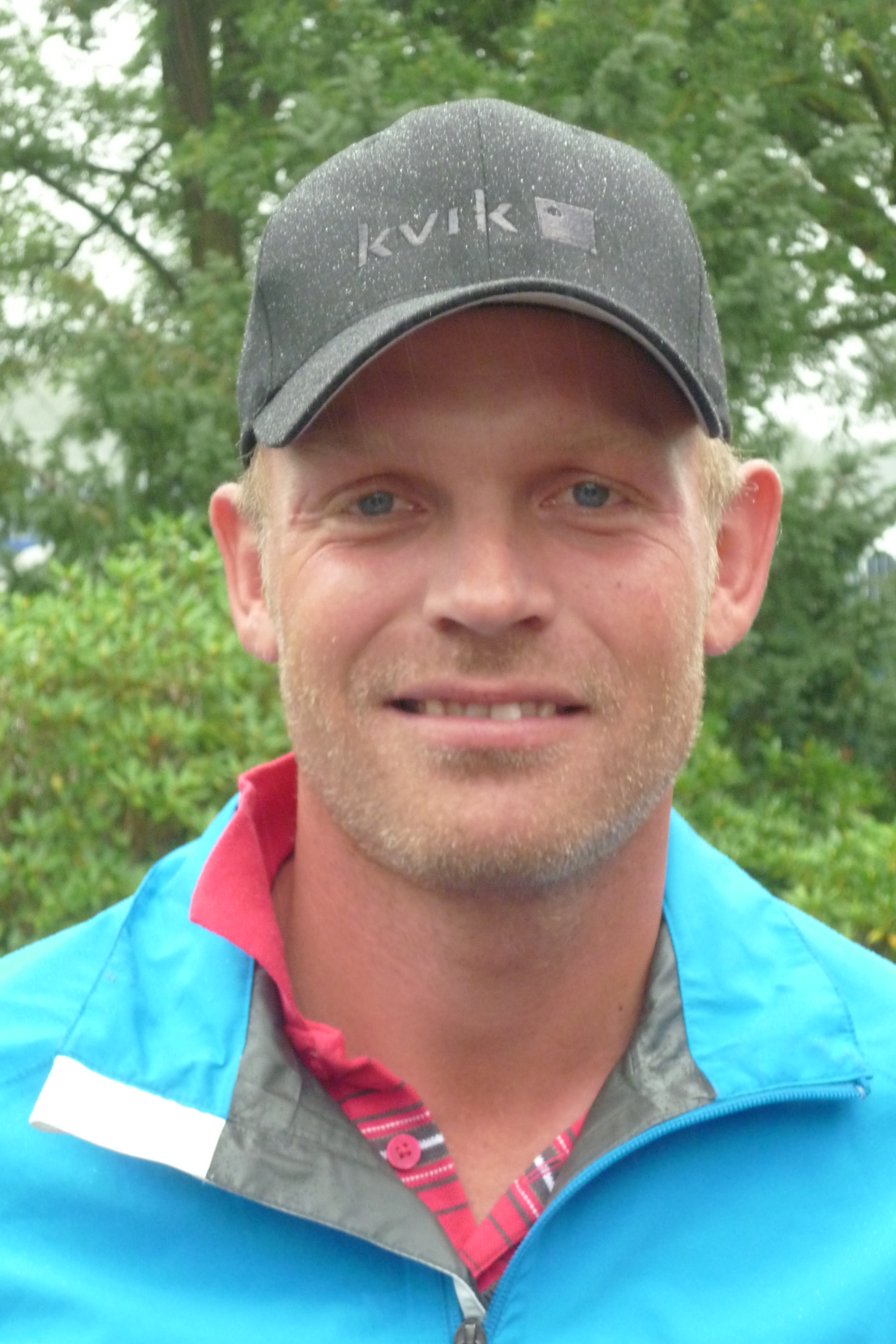

Personal information
- Full name: Jeppe Pape Huldahl
- Nationality: Denmark
- Born: 7 February 1982 (age 44) Holstebro, Denmark
- Height: 1.78 m (5 ft 10 in)
- Children: 2

Career
- Sport: Golf
- Turned professional: 2003
- Current tour: Challenge Tour
- Former tour: European Tour
- Professional wins: 5

Number of wins by tour
- European Tour: 1
- Challenge Tour: 1
- Other: 3

Jeppe Pape Huldahl (born 7 February 1982) is a Danish professional golfer. He has played on the European Tour and the Challenge Tour.

== Career ==
Huldahl was born in Holstebro, and lives in Copenhagen. He turned professional in 2003 and finished 4th at European Tour's final qualifying school at the end of the year to obtain his tour card. He had limited success in his first year on the European Tour in 2004 and stepped down to play on the second-tier Challenge Tour for the following season. He had limited success there too, until the 2008 season, when he won his tour event at the 2008 Lexus Open. He later had a runner-up finish at The Dutch Futures, and went on to finish 10th on the 2008 Challenge Tour's money list to regain his place on the top-level tour for 2009.

After a quiet first half of the 2009 European Tour season, Huldahl was a surprise winner at the Celtic Manor Wales Open at the start of June in tough, wet conditions. He was a co-leader entering the final round and shot a final round 4-under par 67 to win by a single stroke over Sweden's Niclas Fasth. It was the third victory by a Dane on the European Tour in 2009, after Søren Kjeldsen won in Spain, and Sunshine Tour Order of Merit leader at the time Anders Hansen won in South Africa.

== Amateur wins ==
- 2003 Danish Amateur Stroke Play Championship

== Professional wins (5) ==
=== European Tour wins (1) ===
No.	Date	Tournament	Winning score	Margin of victory	Runner-up
1	7 Jun 2009	Celtic Manor Wales Open	−9 (69-71-68-67=275)	1 stroke	(Sweden) Niclas Fasth

=== Challenge Tour wins (1) ===
No.	Date	Tournament	Winning score	Margin of victory	Runner-up
1	10 Aug 2008	Lexus Open	−17 (66-68-68-69=271)	2 strokes	(Scotland) Steven O'Hara

Challenge Tour playoff record (0–2)

No.	Year	Tournament	Opponent	Result
1	2008	Dutch Futures	(Netherlands) Taco Remkes	Lost to birdie on first extra hole
2	2012	Allianz Open Côtes d'Armor Bretagne	(England) Eddie Pepperell	Lost to par on first extra hole

=== Nordic Golf League wins (3) ===
No.	Date	Tournament	Winning score	Margin of victory	Runners-up
1	2 Jun 2007	Dangaard Telecom Masters	−7 (73-67-66=206)	2 strokes	(Finland) Panu Kylliäinen, (Sweden) Christoffer Wahlgren
2	7 Mar 2020	ECCO Tour Spanish Masters	−11 (72-67-62=201)	Playoff	(Norway) Jarand Ekeland Arnøy
3	11 Mar 2020	PGA Catalunya Resort Championship	−10 (71-66-67=204)	1 stroke	(Sweden) Martin Eriksson, (Finland) Lauri Ruuska

== Results in World Golf Championships ==
Tournament	2009
Match Play	
Championship	
Invitational	
Champions	T64

Did not play

"T" = Tied

== Team appearances ==
Amateur

- European Boys' Team Championship (representing Denmark): 1999
- Eisenhower Trophy (representing Denmark): 2002
- European Amateur Team Championship (representing Denmark): 2003

== See also ==
- 2008 Challenge Tour graduates
