= Robin Sciot-Siegrist =

French professional golfer (born 1993)

Personal information
- Nationality: France
- Born: 15 December 1993 (age 32) Rueil-Malmaison, Paris, France
- Height: 180 cm (5 ft 11 in)

Career
- Sport: Golf
- College: University of Louisville
- Turned professional: 2016
- Current tour: Challenge Tour
- Former tour: European Tour
- Professional wins: 1

Number of wins by tour
- Challenge Tour: 1

Robin Sciot-Siegrist (born 15 December 1993) is a French professional golfer who plays on the Challenge Tour. He won the 2017 Northern Ireland Open.

== Amateur career ==
Sciot-Siegrist won the 2009 French Under-16 Championship, 2011 French Under-18 Championship and captured the 2012 Championship de France. He tied for fifth at the 2015 European Amateur and appeared at the 2014 Eisenhower Trophy with Victor Perez and Clément Sordet, where they finished tied 6th.

Sciot-Siegrist attended the University of Louisville from 2012 to 2016, and played with the Louisville Cardinals men's golf team. As a junior he won the ACC Championship and finished tied 4th individually at the NCAA Championship. He crowned his college career with an appearance at the 2016 Arnold Palmer Cup.

== Professional career ==
Sciot-Siegrist turned professional in 2016 and joined the Challenge Tour, where he captured the 2017 Galgorm Resort & Spa Northern Ireland Open. In 2019, he was runner-up at the Challenge Tour Grand Final and finished 16th in the season rankings, narrowly missing out on promotion to by around 1,500 in prize money. Instead, he joined the 2020 European Tour after finishing tied 8th at Q-School.

In his rookie European Tour season in 2020 he finished tied 3rd at the ISPS Handa Vic Open behind Min Woo Lee and Ryan Fox, and at the Euram Bank Open in Austria.

Back on the Challenge Tour in 2022, he was runner-up at the Le Vaudreuil Golf Challenge and Indoor Golf Group Challenge to finish 11th in the season rankings and again earn promotion.

== Amateur wins ==
- 2009 French Under-16 Championship
- 2011 French Under-18 Championship
- 2012 Championship de France
- 2015 ACC Championship, Classic du Prieure, Grand Prix de Saint Nom

== Professional wins (1) ==
=== Challenge Tour wins (1) ===
No.	Date	Tournament	Winning score	Margin of victory	Runner-up
1	13 Aug 2017	Galgorm Resort & Spa Northern Ireland Open	−3 (20) (Note: The event used a knockout format. This is the score in the final.)	2 strokes	(Italy) Alessandro Tadini

Challenge Tour playoff record (0–1)

No.	Year	Tournament	Opponent	Result
1	2022	Le Vaudreuil Golf Challenge	(England) Nathan Kimsey	Lost to birdie on fourth extra hole

== Team appearances ==
Amateur

- Eisenhower Trophy (representing France): 2014
- Arnold Palmer Cup (representing Europe): 2016 (winners)

== See also ==
- List of International Arnold Palmer Cup golfers
- 2019 European Tour Qualifying School graduates
- 2022 Challenge Tour graduates
