= Katrineholm Open =

Tournament information
- Location: Katrineholm, Sweden
- Established: 2011
- Course: Katrineholms Golfklubb
- Par: 72
- Length: 6,955 yards (6,360 m)
- Tours: Challenge Tour; Nordic Golf League; Swedish Golf Tour
- Format: Stroke play
- Prize fund: kr 430,000
- Month played: July
- Final year: 2021

Tournament record score
- Aggregate: 272 Estanislao Goya (2017)
- To par: −16 as above

Final champion
- (Sweden) Hannes Rönneblad
- Location in Sweden

The Katrineholm Open was a golf tournament on the Challenge Tour and the Nordic Golf League that was played at Katrineholms Golfklubb in Katrineholm, Sweden. The Swedish Challenge was played for the first time in August 2016, succeeding a Nordic Golf League event first held in July 2011. The event was hosted by Robert Karlsson since 2011.

== Winners ==
Year	Tour (Note: CHA − Challenge Tour; NGL − Nordic Golf League; SWE − Swedish Golf Tour.)	Winner	Score	To par	Margin of victory	Runner(s)-up	Ref.
Live It Katrineholm Open
2021	NGL	(Sweden) Hannes Rönneblad	203	−13	Playoff	(Sweden) Algot Kleen (a)	
Katrineholm Open
2020	SWE	(Sweden) Ludvig Åberg (a)	206	−10	Playoff	(Sweden) Mikael Lindberg	
2019: No tournament
Swedish Challenge
2018	CHA	(England) Oliver Wilson	275	−13	Playoff	(Denmark) Joachim B. Hansen	
2017	CHA	(Argentina) Estanislao Goya	272	−16	3 strokes	(United States) Sihwan Kim (Sweden) Mikael Lundberg	
2016	CHA	(France) Joël Stalter	276	−12	Playoff	(Wales) Oliver Farr (England) Ben Stow	
Katrineholm Open
2015	NGL	(Sweden) Gustav Adell	207	−9	1 stroke	(Sweden) Björn Hellgren	
2014	NGL	(Sweden) Jesper Billing	206	−10	Playoff	(Denmark) Patrick O'Neill	
2013	NGL	(Sweden) Joakim Wikström	204	−12	2 strokes	(Sweden) Niclas Johansson (Sweden) Malcolm Kokocinski	
2012	NGL	(Sweden) Kristoffer Broberg	206	−10	1 stroke	(Sweden) Johan Carlsson	
2011	NGL	(Sweden) Joakim Rask	205	−11	1 stroke	(Sweden) Petter Bocian	
