= Steven Jeppesen =

Swedish professional golfer

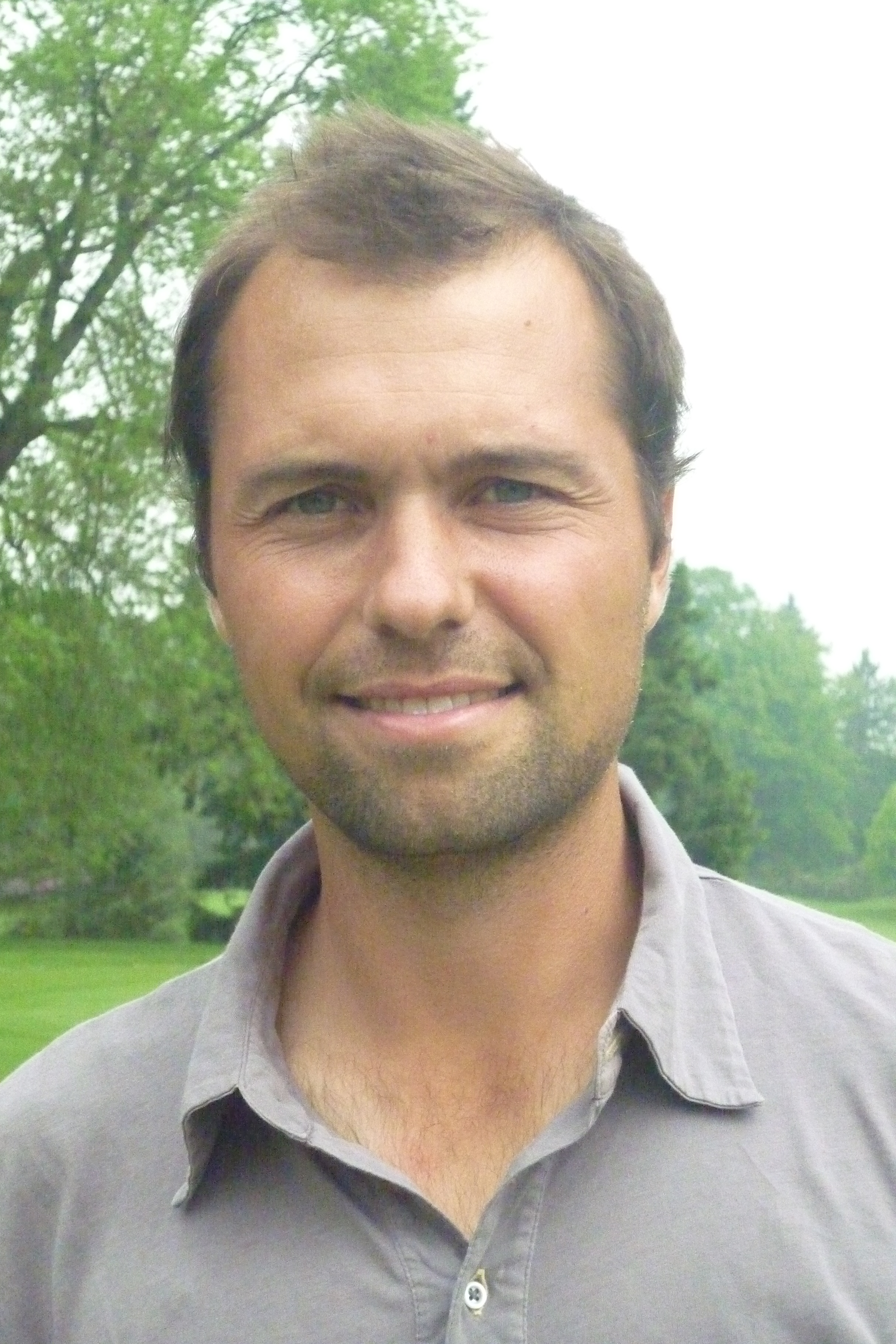

Personal information
- Full name: Steven Svejstrup Jeppesen
- Nationality: Sweden
- Born: 22 April 1984 (age 42) Helsingør, Denmark
- Height: 1.79 m (5 ft 10 in)
- Weight: 67 kg (148 lb; 10.6 st)
- Spouse: Sofia

Career
- Sport: Golf
- Turned professional: 2003
- Former tours: European Tour; Challenge Tour
- Professional wins: 3

Steven Svejstrup Jeppesen (born 22 April 1984) is a Swedish professional golfer.

== Career ==
Jeppesen played for the Swedish National team as an amateur and won on his first outing for the team, the Junior Open Championship at Crail, Scotland, in 2000. He also won the 2001 European Boys' Team Championship, with a team that included Gustav Adell, Robert Svensson, Johannes Andersson, Jonas Blixt and Niklas Lemke.

Jeppesen finished 10th and best Swedish player at the 2003 individual European Amateur Championship at Nairn Golf Club, Scotland.

Jeppesen turned professional in 2003 at the age of nineteen, and immediately qualified for the European Tour for the 2004 season via qualifying school. At the season's opening tournament on European soil in March 2004, he shared the lead going into the final round of the Madeira Island Open, but had to settle for a runner-up position one stroke behind compatriot Chris Hanell after a final round of 76. He again came close to securing his maiden European Tour victory at the 2005 Aa St Omer Open, losing out on joining the playoff between Joakim Bäckström and Paul Dwyer by one stroke.

Jeppesen failed to earn enough money to maintain his playing status, and only regained his place on the main tour by finishing sixth on the 2005 Challenge Tour rankings, thanks to runner-up finishes at the Austrian Open, Kazakhstan Open and Open de Toulouse. He played on the European Tour for the following two seasons, then combined the European and Challenge Tours for two years, before coming through qualifying school once more in 2009.

In 2009, Jeppesen finished runner-up at Challenge de España, one stroke behind Rhys Davies. In 2011 he won twice on the Nordic League golf tour, his first professional wins.

== Amateur wins ==
- 2000 Junior Open Championship
- 2001 Swedish Junior Stroke-play Championship
- 2002 Junior Masters Invitational

== Professional wins (3) ==
=== Nordic Golf League wins (3) ===
No.	Date	Tournament	Winning score	Margin of victory	Runner(s)-up
1	1 May 2011	PEAB PGA Grand Opening	−7 (71-70-68=209)	2 strokes	(Sweden) Stefan Nilsson
2	21 Aug 2011	Gefle Open	−8 (67-69-72=208)	1 stroke	(Sweden) Kristoffer Broberg
3	28 Mar 2014	Mediter Real Estate Masters	−2 (71-71-73=215)	1 stroke	(Sweden) Jacob Glennemo, (Denmark) Daniel Løkke, (Sweden) David Palm, (Spain) Manuel Quirós

== Team appearances ==
Amateur

- European Boys' Team Championship (representing Sweden): 2001 (winners), 2002
- European Amateur Team Championship (representing Sweden): 2003

== See also ==
- 2005 Challenge Tour graduates
- 2009 European Tour Qualifying School graduates
