= Joakim Wikström =

Swedish professional golfer (born 1991)

Personal information
- Full name: Joakim Simon Wikström
- Nationality: Sweden
- Born: 18 December 1991 (age 34) Gothenburg, Sweden

Career
- Sport: Golf
- Turned professional: 2013
- Current tours: Challenge Tour; Nordic Golf League
- Professional wins: 7

Joakim Wikström (born 18 December 1991) is a Swedish professional golfer and Challenge Tour player. He has won five times on the Nordic Golf League and was runner-up at the 2023 Vierumäki Finnish Challenge.

== Career ==
Wikström represented Sjögärde Golf Club before switching to nearby Hills Golf Club. He turned professional in 2013 and joined the Nordic Golf League, after he topped the leaderboard at Q-School, held at Elisefarm Golf Club. He recorded a win in his rookie season at the Katrineholm Open, hosted by Robert Karlsson.

In 2020, Wikström won the V Sport Golf Challenge at PGA Sweden National Lakes Course after shooting a course record 61 in the third round. He secured a second title of the season at Visby Open, where he won a playoff on the second hole.

Wikström finished third in the 2021 Nordic Golf League rankings to earn promotion to the 2022 Challenge Tour. In 2023, he was runner-up at the Vierumäki Finnish Challenge after recording a 61 in the final round.

== Amateur wins ==
- 2007 Skandia Tour Riks #5 - Västergötland
- 2010 Pulsen Open

== Professional wins (7) ==
=== Nordic Golf League wins (5) ===
No.	Date	Tournament	Winning score	Margin of victory	Runner(s)-up
1	5 Jul 2013	Katrineholm Open	−12 (65-71-68=204)	2 strokes	(Sweden) Niclas Johansson, (Sweden) Malcolm Kokocinski
2	27 Aug 2020	V Sport Golf Challenge	−17 (72-66-61=199)	1 stroke	(Sweden) Niclas Johansson
3	24 Sep 2020	Visby Open	−7 (68-70-71=209)	Playoff	(Finland) Juuso Kahlos
4	18 Jun 2021	Samsø Pro-Am Classic	−13 (67-68-68=203)	2 strokes	(Sweden) Adam Eineving, (Sweden) Christopher Feldborg Nielsen, (Sweden) Alexander Wennstam, (Denmark) Sebastian Wiis
5	28 Feb 2023	ECCO Tour Spanish Masters	−9 (70-70-67=207)	Playoff	(Denmark) Sebastian Wiis

=== Other wins (2) ===
- 2017 Lerjedalen Open (SGF Golf Ranking)
- 2019 Silfverschiöldspokalen (Future Series)
