= Black Mountain Golf Club =

Golf course in Thailand

Coordinates: 12.6145°N 99.8917°E

- Location in Thailand

Club information
- Location: Hua Hin, Thailand
- Established: 2005
- Type: Public
- Tota holes: 27
- Tournaments: True Thailand Classic; Black Mountain Masters; Black Mountain Invitational; International Series Thailand
- Website: blackmountainhuahin.com

East
- Par: 36

North
- Par: 36

West
- Par: 36

Black Mountain Golf Club is a championship golf course located ten kilometers west of the city of Hua Hin, Thailand. Recognized as one of the best in Thailand and Asia-Pacific, it has hosted the Black Mountain Masters and the International Series Thailand on the Asian Tour, as well as the True Thailand Classic, co-sanctioned by the European Tour.

== History ==
The club was founded by Swedish entrepreneur Stig Notlöv in 2005. Notlöv was born in Pajala and founded Byggmax, a chain of 200 home improvement stores, which he sold to invest in the course in Hua Hin. The original 18 holes opened on 20 April 2007, and in 2016 another 9 holes, the West course, were added.

Numerous awards followed rapidly. In 2011, Black Mountain was named the best course in Thailand and the best championship course in Asia-Pacific by the Asian Golf Monthly.

In 2012, Black Mountain became the first course in Thailand to be included in US Golf Digest's list of the Best 100 Courses Outside the United States.

The Black Mountain Championship was voted Tournament of the Year on the 2024 Asian Tour by the players.

== Tournaments hosted ==
The club has hosted several Asian Tour events as well as events co-sanctioned by the European Tour.

=== Professional tournaments ===
Year	Tour (Note: ASA − Asian Tour; EUR − European Tour; SGT − Swedish Golf Tour.)	Tournament	Champion
2009	ASA	Black Mountain Masters	(Sweden) Johan Edfors
2010	ASA	Black Mountain Masters	(Japan) Tetsuji Hiratsuka
2011	ASA, (Note: Unofficial event) EUR	2011 Royal Trophy	Europe
2013	SGT	Black Mountain Invitational	(Sweden) Johan Edfors
2014	SGT	Black Mountain Invitational	(Sweden) Björn Hellgren
2015	SGT	Black Mountain Invitational	(Sweden) Björn Hellgren (2)
2015	ASA, EUR	True Thailand Classic	(Australia) Andrew Dodt
2016	ASA, EUR	True Thailand Classic	(Australia) Scott Hend
2016	SGT	Black Mountain Invitational	(Sweden) Malcolm Kokocinski
2022	ASA	International Series Thailand	(United States) Sihwan Kim
2023	ASA	International Series Thailand	(Australia) Wade Ormsby
2024	ASA	Black Mountain Championship	(United States) M. J. Maguire

== See also ==
- Golf in Thailand
