= Golf in Thailand =

Golf arrived in Thailand during the reign of King Rama V at the Royal Bangkok Sports Club and Royal Hua Hin Golf Course. It was first played by nobles and other elites of high society but is now played by a wider segment of the population. Retail and fashion industries golf promotions are popular in the Si Lom Road part of Bangkok in Thaniya Plaza shopping mall.

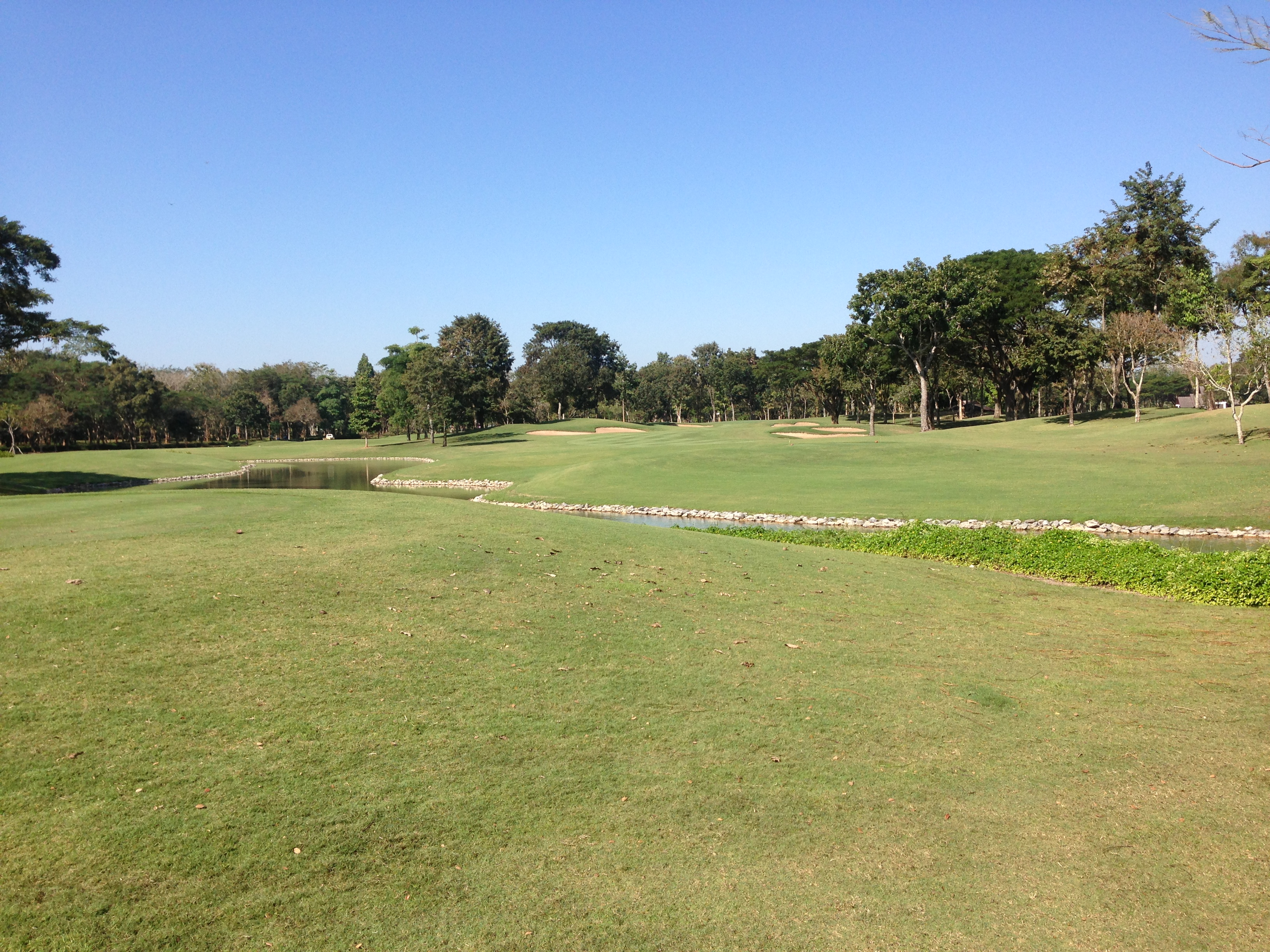
Santiburi Country Club, Chiang Rai

As of 2022, there are approximately 300 golf courses in Thailand. 124 golf courses were built between 1990 and 1995. An estimated 700,000 tourists fly into Thailand every year to play golf. Destination diversity and the choice of golf courses throughout the country are key factors attracting the large numbers of visitors coming to play golf in Thailand. The most popular destination for golfing in Thailand especially for tourists is the Chonburi Province, where there are 27 golf courses.

== Significant golf tournament history ==
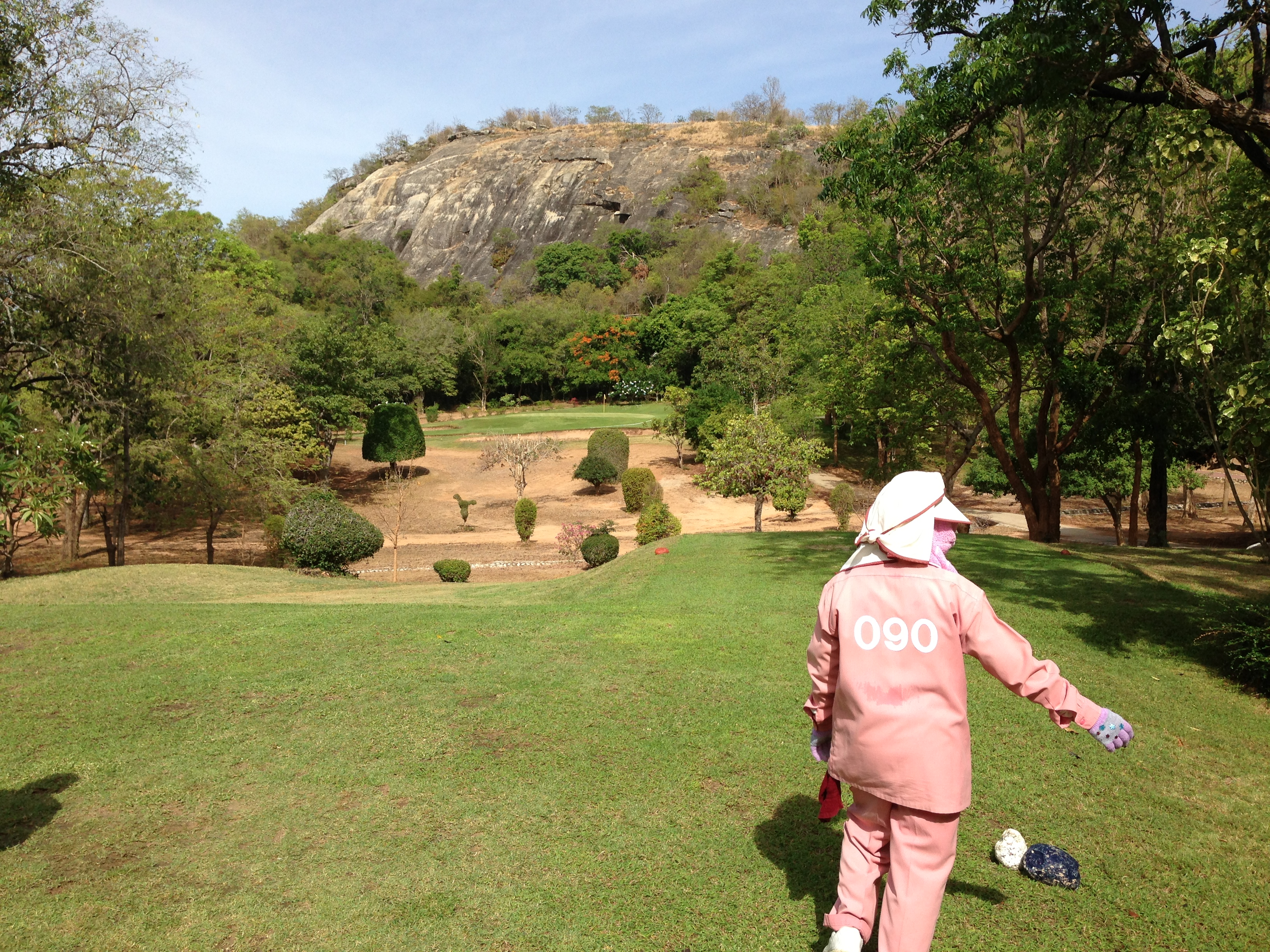
Par 3 5th hole at Royal Hua Hin Golf Course

- Honda LPGA Thailand is an annual LPGA tournament held at Siam Country Club, Pattaya Old Course
- The 1998 Johnnie Walker Classic was won by Tiger Woods at Blue Canyon in Phuket.
- Thailand Golf Championship was a professional golf tournament on the Asian Tour held at Amata Spring Country Club in Chonburi province from 2011 to 2015.
- The Asia-Pacific Amateur Championship was held at Amata Spring Country Club in Chonburi province in 2012 and 2022.
- Portmarnock won the 2016 World Club Championship at Ayodhya Links hosted by Pitak Intrawityanunt.
- Black Mountain in Cha Am has hosted a number of European Tour and Asian Tour professional events: True Thailand Classic, Black Mountain Masters, 2011 Royal Trophy
- Santiburi Koh Samui hosted the Asian Tour Queen's Cup a number of times.

== Notable golfers ==
Thai golfers have achieved international success on the Asian Tour, European Tour, PGA Tour Champions and LPGA Tour. The following lists include Thai men's golfers with at least five Asian Tour wins or major international tour wins, and Thai women's golfers with LPGA Tour wins.

=== Men ===
- Thongchai Jaidee – 8 European Tour wins, 13 Asian Tour wins and 2 PGA Tour Champions wins
- Kiradech Aphibarnrat – 4 European Tour wins and 3 Asian Tour wins
- Thaworn Wiratchant – 1 European Tour win and 18 Asian Tour wins, the most in tour history
- Chapchai Nirat – 1 European Tour win and 4 Asian Tour wins
- Prayad Marksaeng – 10 Asian Tour wins
- Jazz Janewattananond – 7 Asian Tour wins
- Boonchu Ruangkit – 5 Asian Tour wins and 5 European Senior Tour wins
- Thammanoon Sriroj – 5 Asian Tour wins

=== Women ===
- Ariya Jutanugarn – 12 LPGA Tour wins, including 2 major championships; former world No. 1
- Jeeno Thitikul – 9 LPGA Tour wins; former world No. 1
- Jasmine Suwannapura – 3 LPGA Tour wins
- Moriya Jutanugarn – 3 LPGA Tour wins
- Chanettee Wannasaen – 2 LPGA Tour wins
- Patty Tavatanakit – 2 LPGA Tour wins, including 1 major championship
- Pajaree Anannarukarn – 2 LPGA Tour wins

== Golf courses ==
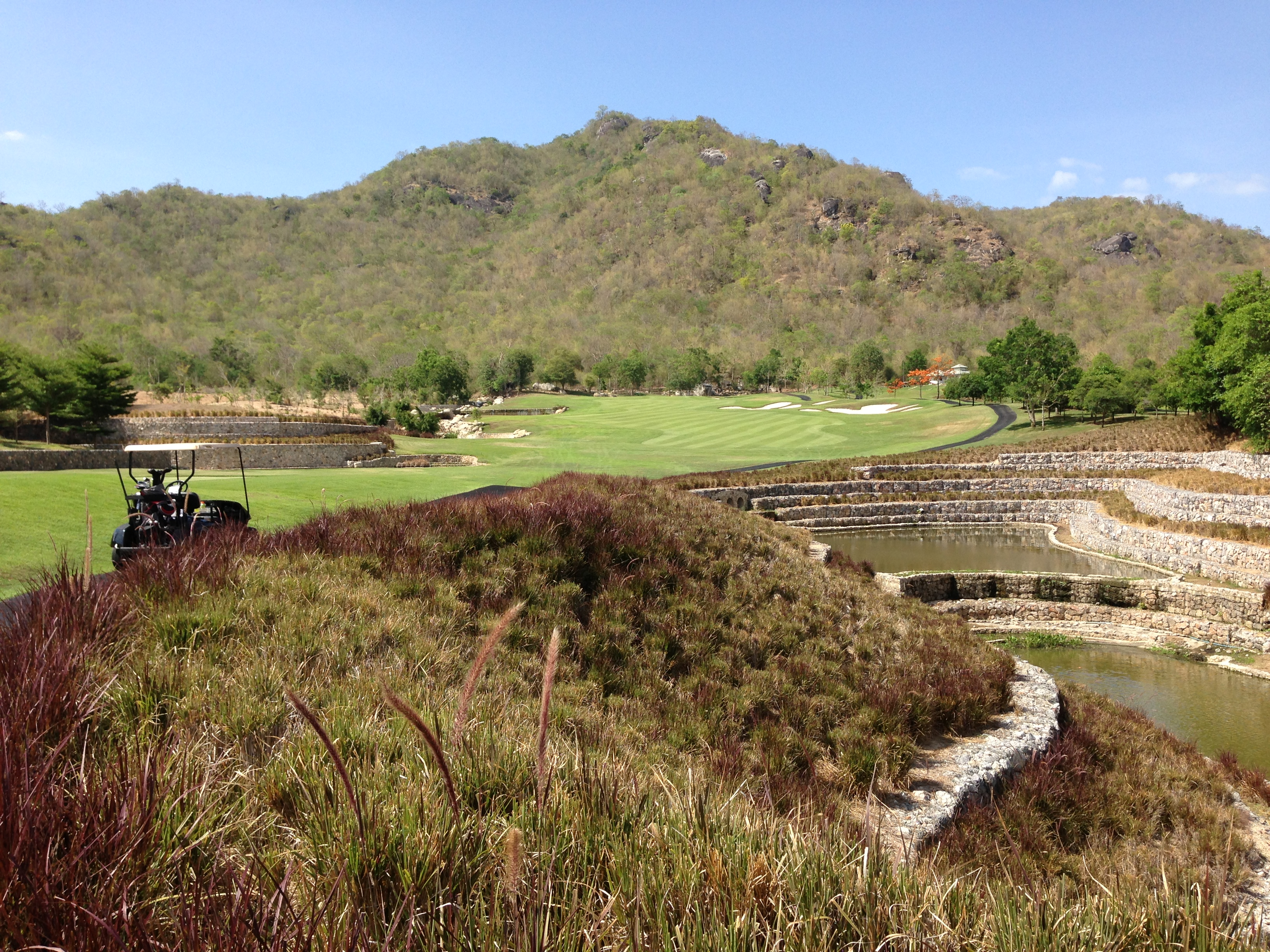
Par 4 10th hole at Black Mountain

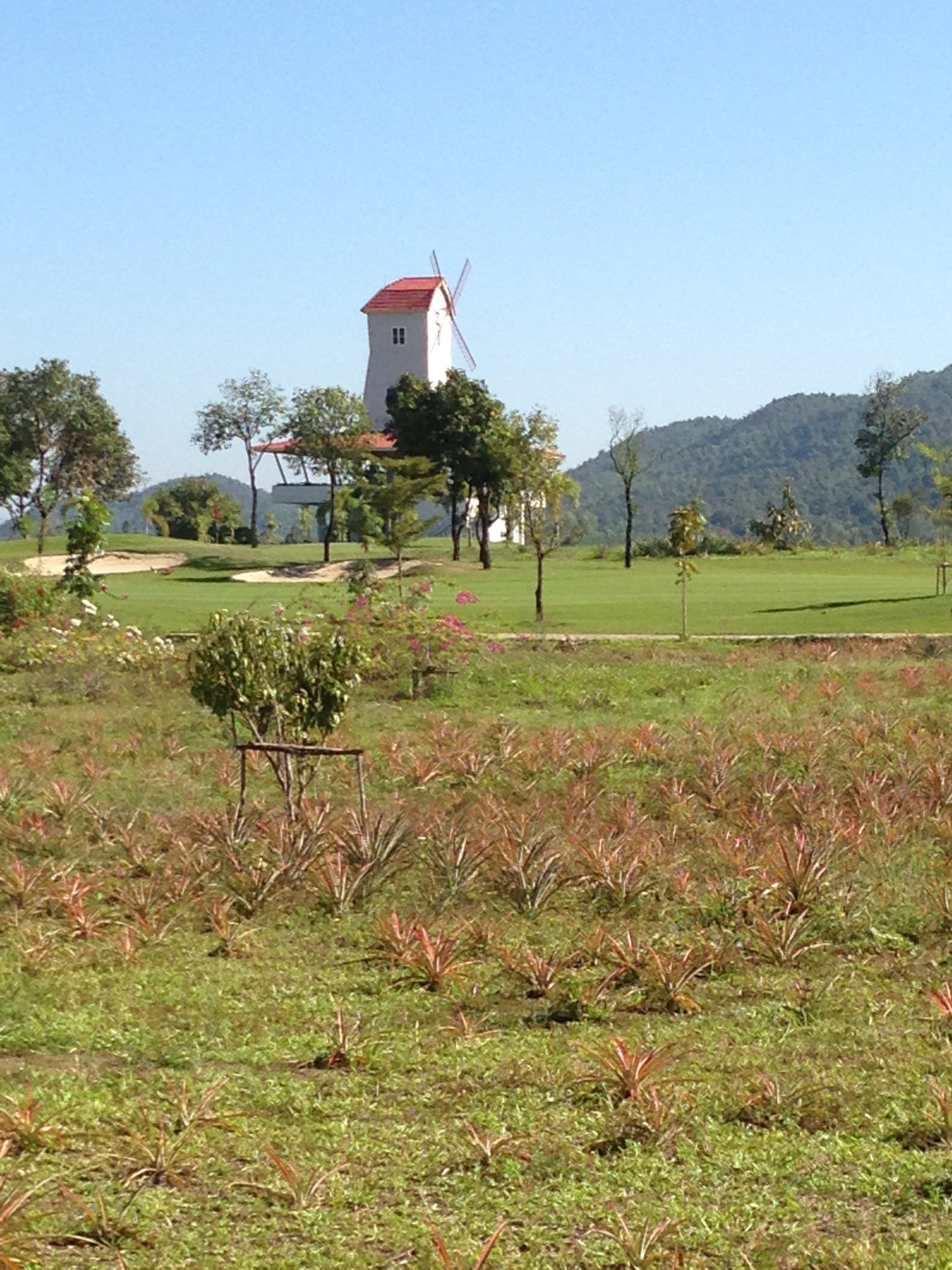
Food/beverage at windmill at Happy City Golf Course

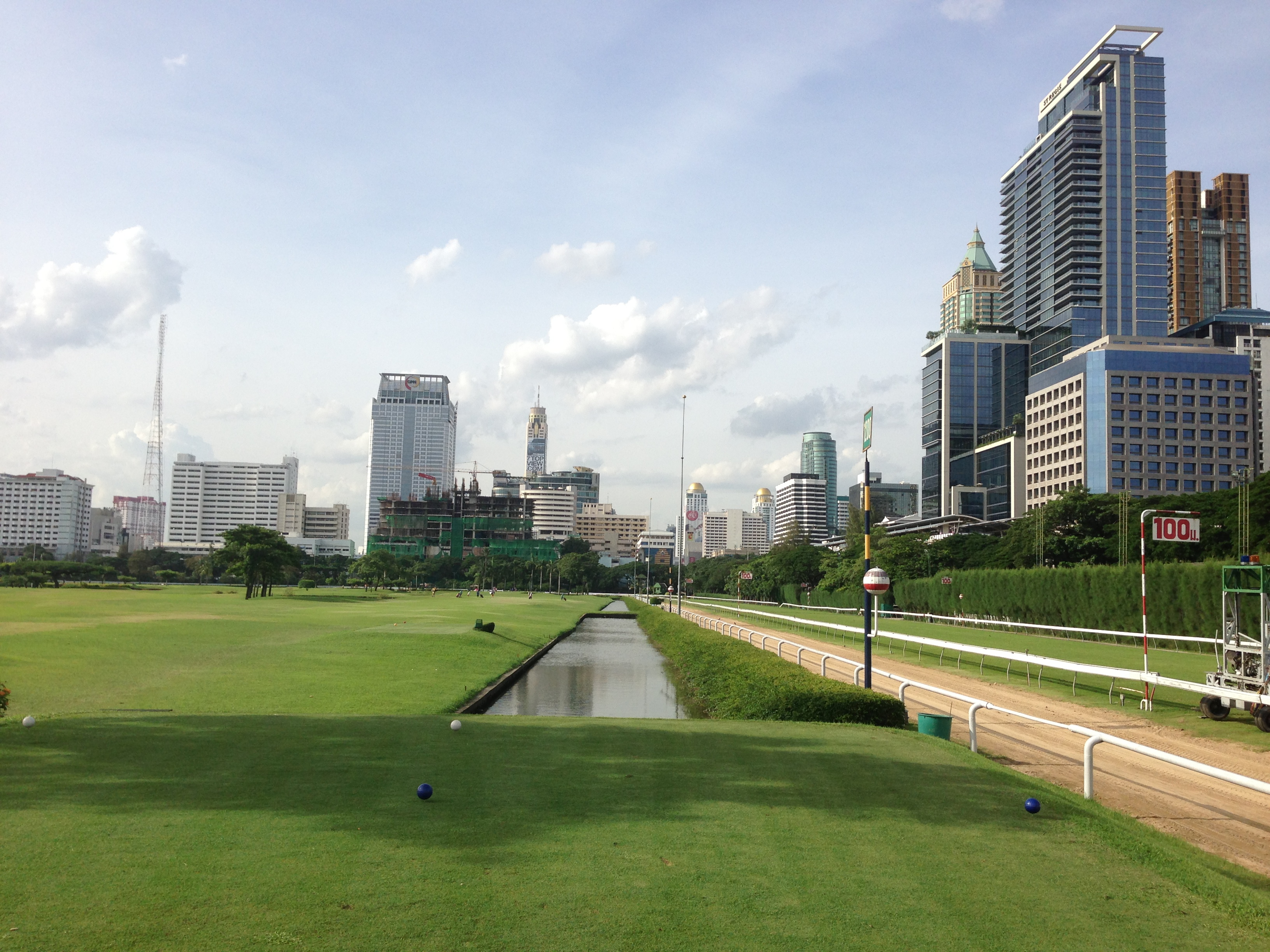
Tee shot at Royal Bangkok Sports Club

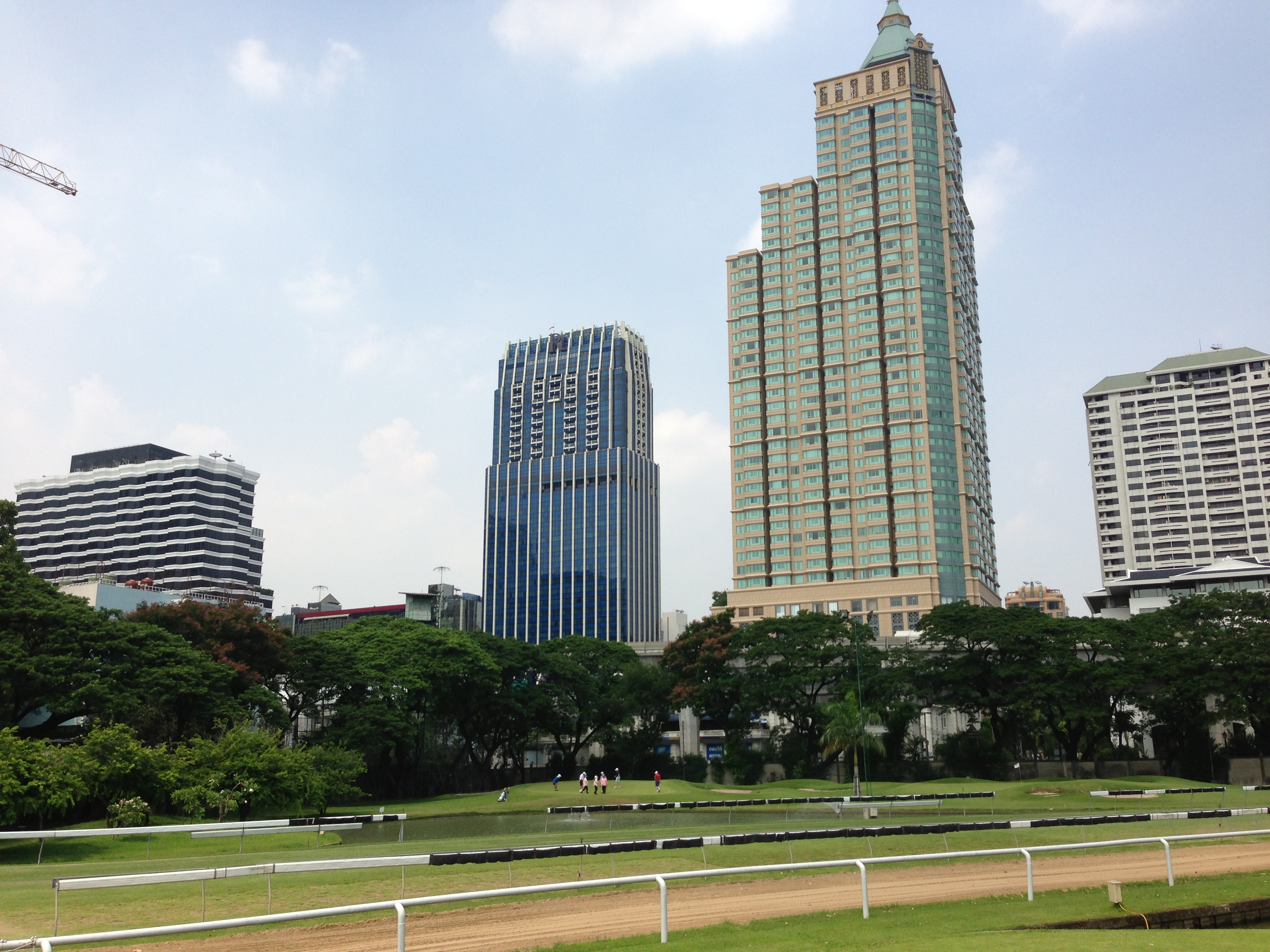
Approach shot at Royal Bangkok Sports Club

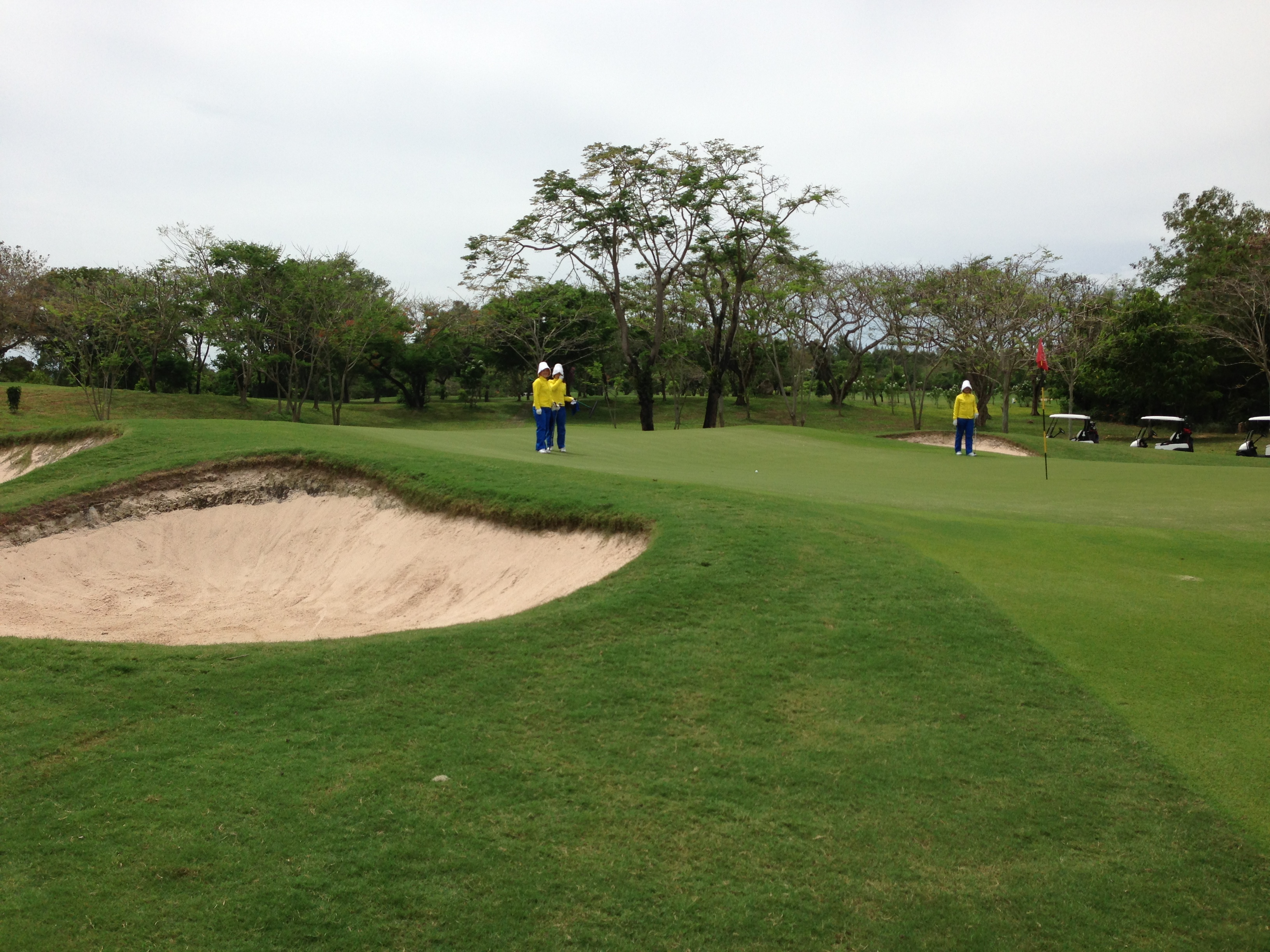
Caddies at greensite on Siam Country Club (Old)

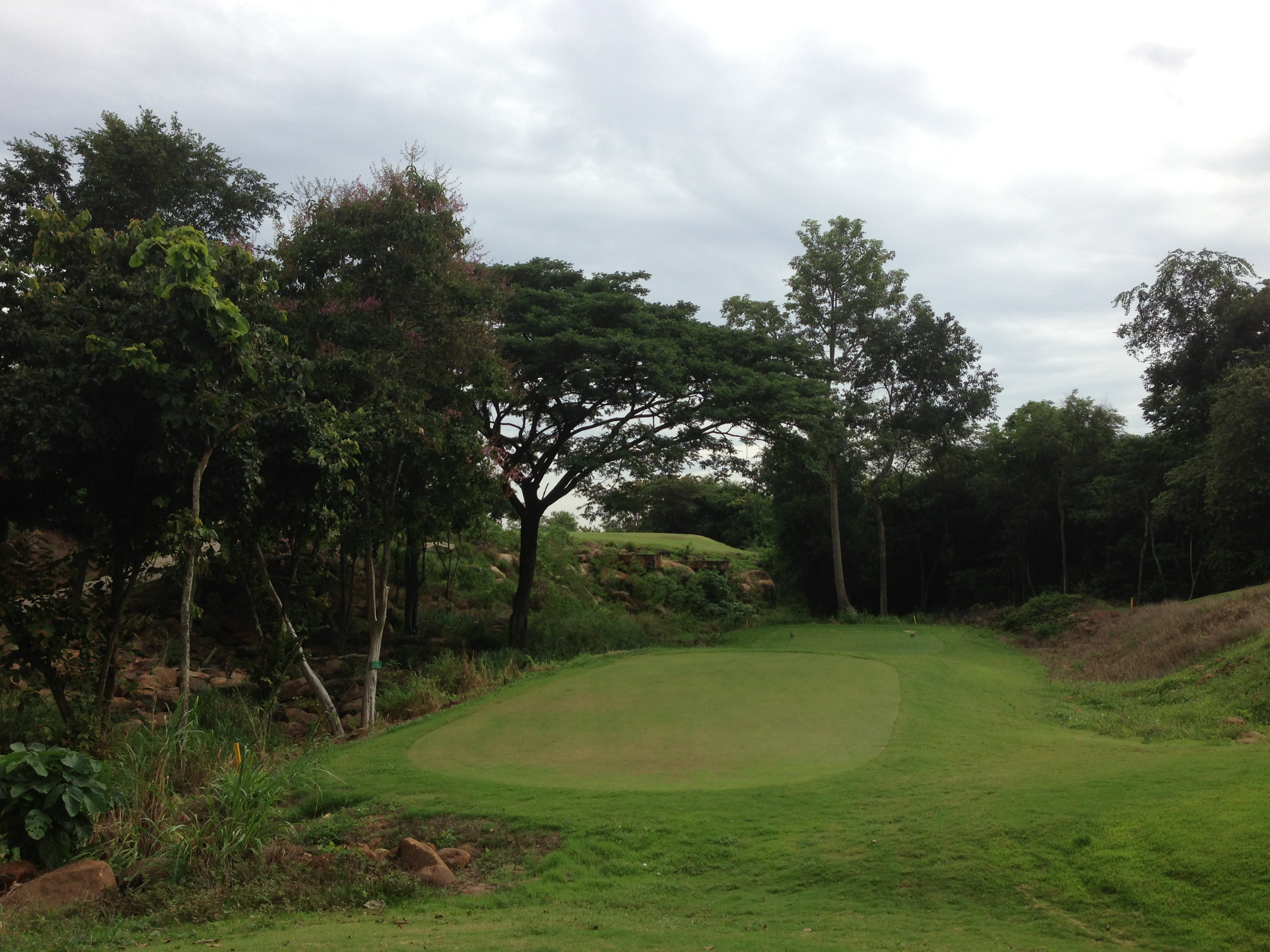
Seve Ballesteros designed Mountain Creek Par 3 2nd Hole to elevated green thru trees

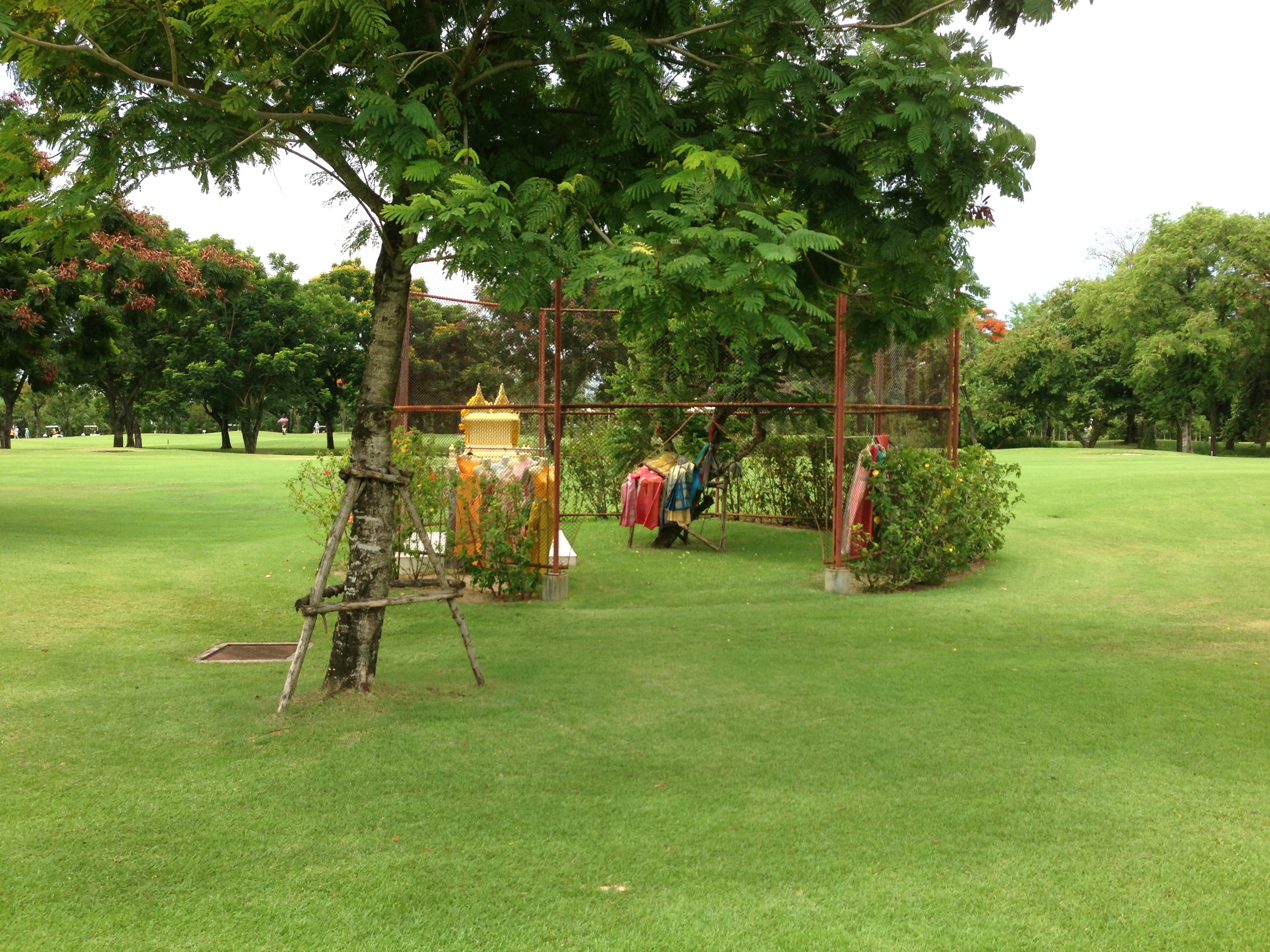
Shrine between fairways at Krungthep Kreetha Golf Course

- 331 Golf Club
- ACDC Golf Course
- Ait Golf Club
- Alpine Golf and Sports Club
- Alpine Golf Resort Chiang Mai
- Amata Spring Country Club
- Aquella Country Club
- Artitaya Country Club (Bangkok Royal Country Club)
- Ayodhya Links
- Ayutthaya Golf Club
- Bangkok Golf Club
- Bangna Navy Golf Course
- Bangpakong Riverside Golf
- Bangpoo Golf and Sport Club
- Bangpra International Golf Club
- Bangsai Country Club
- Banyan Golf Club
- Best Ocean Golf
- Bhumibol Dam Golf Course
- Black Mountain Golf Club
- Blue Canyon Country Club
- Blue Sapphire Golf and Resort
- Blue Star Golf Course
- Bodindecha Golf Club
- Bonanza Golf and Country Club
- Burapha
- Cascata Golf Club
- Chatrium Golf Resort Soi Dao Chanthaburi
- Chee Chan Golf Course
- Chiang Mai Inthanon Golf Resort
- Chiangmai Gymkhana Club
- Chiangmai Highlands Golf and Spa Resort
- Chaophraya Dam Golf Course
- Chonburi Century Country Club
- Chuan Chuen Golf Club
- Chulabhorn Dam Golf Course
- Crystal Bay
- Crystal Lake Golf Club
- Dancoon Golf Club
- Dhupatemiya Golf Course
- Dongpukurd Golf Course
- Dragon Hills Golf and Country Club
- Dynasty Golf and Country Club
- Eastern Star Golf Course
- Ekachai Golf and Country Club
- Emerald Golf Club
- Evergreen Hills Golf Club and Resort
- Flora Ville Chuan Chuen Golf Club
- Forest Hills Country Club, Sir James Country Club
- Friendship Meadows Country Club
- Gassan Khuntan Golf and Resort
- Gassan Legacy Golf Club
- Gassan Panorama
- Gold Canyon Country Club
- Grand Prix Golf Club
- Great Lake Golf and Country Club
- Green Valley Bangkok
- Greenwood Golf Club
- Hang Dong Golf Club, Chiangmai
- Happy City Golf Resort
- Hariphunchai Golf Club
- Hat Yai Resort and Golf Club
- Hillside Country Home
- Iyara Golf Course
- Jiraprawat Golf Course
- Jompol Por Golf Course
- Jungle Golf Club
- Kabinburi Sportclub
- Kaeng Krachan Country Club and Resort
- Kantarat Golf Course
- Katathong Golf and Resort
- Ket Udomsak Golf Club
- Khao ChaNgok Golf and Country Club
- Khao Kheow Country Club
- Khao Yai Golf Club
- Kiarti Thanee Country Club
- Kirimaya Golf Club (The Country Club KhaoYai)
- Kirinara Golf Course
- Koh Hong Golf Club
- Korat Country Club Golf and Resort
- Krisda City Golf Hills
- Krung Kavee Golf Course and Country Club
- Krungthep Kreetha Sports Club
- Kumlung-Ake Golf Course
- Laem Chabang International
- Laguna Phuket Golf Club
- Lakewood Country Club
- Lam Luk Ka Country Club
- Lanna Golf Course
- Life Privilege, Mission Hills
- Loch Palm Golf Club
- Lotus Valley Golf Resort
- Mae Jo Golf Club and Resort
- Mae Kok Golf Course, Mueang Chiang Rai
- Mae Moh Golf Course
- Mida Golf Club (The Lion Hills Golf and Country Club)
- Milford Golf Club (Hua Hin Seoul Country Club)
- Mission Hills Phuket Golf Resort and Spa
- Mountain Creek Resort
- Mountain Shadow
- Muang Ake Golf Course
- Muang Ake Vista Golf Course
- Muang Ake Wang Noi Golf Course
- Muang Kaew Golf Course
- My Ozone Golf Club Khao Yai
- Narai Hill Golf and Country Club
- Navatanee Golf Course
- NCR Golf and Resort
- Nichigo Resort and Country Club
- Nikanti Golf Club
- Nong Samrong Golf Course
- North Hill Golf Club
- Northern Rangsit Golf Club
- Pak Chong Country Club
- Palm Hills Golf Club and Residence
- Panorama Golf and Country Club
- Panurangsri Golf Course
- Panya Indra Golf Club
- Parichat International Golf Links
- Pattana Golf Club and Resort
- Pattavia Century Golf Club
- Pattaya Country Club and Resort
- Phoenix Gold Golf and Country Club
- Phutthalung Golf Club
- Plutaluang Royal Thai Navy Golf Course
- Phu Kradae Golf Course (Nakhon Phanom University Course)
- Phuket Country Club
- Pinehurst Golf Club
- Pleasant Valley Golf Course
- Plutaluang Royal Thai Navy Golf Course
- Praphasi Golf Club
- President Country Club
- Prime City Golf Club
- Rachakram Golf Club
- Rajjaprabha Dam Golf Course
- Rajpruek Club
- Rancho Charnvee Country Club
- Rangsit Sports Club
- Rayong Green Valley
- Recruit Training Center Golf Course
- Red Mountain Golf Club
- Riverdale Golf Club
- Robinswood Golf Club
- Roi Et Golf Club
- Rooks Korat Country Club Golf and Resort
- Rose Garden Golf Club
- Royal Bangpa In Golf Course
- Royal Chiang Mai Golf Resort
- Royal Creek Golf Club and Resort
- Royal Dusit Golf Club
- Royal Hills Golf Resort
- Royal Hua Hin Golf Course
- Royal Irrigation Dept. Golf Course
- Royal Lakeside Golf Club
- Royal Ratchaburi Golf Club
- Royal Samui Golf and Country Club
- Royal Thai Air Force Golf Course (Thong Yai)
- Royal Thai Army Sports Center (New Course)
- Royal Thai Army Sports Center (Old Course)
- Royal Thai Fleet Golf Course A
- Royal Thai Fleet Golf Course B
- Royal Thai Fleet Golf Course C
- Salaya Naval Golf Course
- Sand Creek Golf Course
- Santiburi Golf Club Chiang Rai
- Santiburi Samui Country Club
- Sawang Resort Golf Club
- Sea Pine Golf Course
- Siam Country Club (Old Course)
- Siam Country Club Bangkok
- Siam Country Club Plantation
- Siam Country Club Waterside
- Siam Rolling Hills
- Siharatdechochai Golf Course
- Silky Oaks
- Silver Star Golf Course
- Singha Park Khon Kaen Golf Club
- Sirindhorn Dam Golf Course
- Southern Hills Golf and Country Club
- Springfield Royal Country Club
- Sri Nakarin Dam Golf Course
- St Andrews 2000
- Star Dome Golf Club (Wing 41)
- Stone Hill Golf Club
- Subhapruek Golf Course
- Suer Park Golf Club
- Summit Green Valley Chiangmai Country Club
- Summit Windmill Golf Club
- Sunrise Lagoon Hotel and Golf
- Suranaree Golf Course
- Surin Army Golf Course (Fort Weerawatyothin)
- Suvarnabhumi Golf and Country Club
- Suwan Golf and Country Club
- Tanyatanee Country Club
- Thai Country Club
- Thai Marine Golf Course Bangsaray
- Thai Muang Beach Golf
- Thana City
- Thanarat Golf Club
- Thanont Golf View
- Thanya Golf Club
- The Banyan Golf Club
- The Emerald Golf Club
- The Imperial Lake View Hotel and Golf Club
- The Legacy Golf Club
- The Majestic Creek Country Club
- The Pine Golf and Lodge (Nongjok Golf Club)
- The Royal Bangkok Sports Club
- The Royal Gems Golf and Sports Club
- The Royal Gems Golf City
- The Royal Golf and Country Club
- The Vintage Club
- Thong Yai Golf Course
- Tiger Wing Golf Club
- Tongthai Banrai Golf Course
- Toscana Valley
- Treasure Hill
- Tungsong Golf Course
- Ubonrat Golf Course
- Ubolratana Dam
- Udon Golf Club and Resort
- Unico Grande Golf Course
- Uniland Golf and Country Club
- Victory Park Golf and Country Club
- Wangjuntr Golf Park
- Waterford Valley, Chiangrai
- Watermill Golf
- Windsor Park and Golf Club
- Wing 21 Golf Club
- Wing 23 Golf Course
- Woo Sung Castle Hill Country Club
