= Hills Golf Club =

Golf club in Mölndal, Sweden

Coordinates: 57.6214°N 12.0125°E

- Location in Sweden

Club information
- Location: Mölndal, Sweden
- Established: 2004
- Type: Public
- Total holes: 18
- Tournaments: Scandinavian Mixed
- Website: hillsgolfclub.se

Hills Course
- Designed by: Arthur Hills; Steve Forrest; Johan Edfors
- Par: 72
- Length: 6336 m

Hills Golf Club is a golf club located in Mölndal near Gothenburg, Sweden. It has hosted two European Tour events, the Nordea Masters in August 2018, and Scandinavian Invitation i August 2019.

== History ==
Situated ten kilometers south of central Gothenburg, the 18-hole course, designed by Arthur Hills, opened in 2004. At a cost of SEK 175 million it is one of the most ambitions golf projects in the Gothenburg Metropolitan Area, only rivaled by Vallda Golf & Country Club, opened in 2009.

A victim of the European debt crisis, in 2012 a consortium fronted by former European Tour player Johan Edfors from nearby Varberg bought the club. Edfors redesigned six of the holes and the new course was inaugurated in June 2014.

The Hills course is laid out across a rugged landscape through woodland, marshland, forest ridges and rocky outcrops. It begins and ends in a large natural amphitheater, with the 1st and 10th tees and the clubhouse all sitting on a huge rocky promontory overlooking the 9th and 18th holes, which are played on either side of a lake.

Golfers Beatrice Wallin, Sofie Bringner, Hanna-Sofia Leijon, Carin Hjalmarsson, Joel Sjöholm, Niclas Fasth and Denmark's Thomas Bjørn have all been attached to the club in various capacities.

== Tournaments hosted ==
=== Professional tournaments ===
Year	Tour	Championship	Winner	Ref.
2025	LET	Hills Ladies Open	(Sweden) Meja Örtengren (am)	
2019	EUR	Scandinavian Invitation	(South Africa) Erik van Rooyen	
2018	EUR	Nordea Masters	(England) Paul Waring	
2008	CHA	Dubliner Challenge	(Denmark) Mark Haastrup	
2007	SGT	Telia Ladies Finale	(Slovakia) Zuzana Kamasová	

=== Amateur tournaments ===
- Swedish Junior Matchplay Championship – 2013

== See also ==
- List of golf courses in Sweden
