= 2015 Swedish Golf Tour =

Golf tour season

2015 Swedish Golf Tour season
- Duration: 21 February 2015 – 10 October 2015
- Number of official events: 19
- Order of Merit: (Sweden) Björn Hellgren

The 2015 Swedish Golf Tour, titled as the 2015 Nordea Tour for sponsorship reasons, was the 32nd season of the Swedish Golf Tour, the main professional golf tour in Sweden since it was formed in 1984, with most tournaments being incorporated into the Nordic Golf League since 1999.

== Schedule ==
The following table lists official events during the 2015 season.

| Date | Tournament | Location | Purse (SKr) | Winner (Note: The number in brackets after each winner's name is the number of Swedish Golf Tour events they had won up to and including that tournament. As most Swedish Golf Tour events are incorporated into the Nordic Golf League schedule, details of these wins are displayed there instead.) | Main tour (Note: NGL − Nordic Golf League.) |
|---|---|---|---|---|---|
| 23 Feb | Lumine Lakes Open | Spain | €55,000 | (Denmark) Peter Vejgaard | NGL |
| 28 Feb | Lumine Hills Open | Spain | €55,000 | (Norway) Eirik Tage Johansen | NGL |
| 20 Apr | Black Mountain Invitational | Thailand | 400,000 | (Sweden) Björn Hellgren (2) | |
| 1 May | Bravo Tours Open | Denmark | DKr 300,000 | (Denmark) Daniel Løkke | NGL |
| 13 May | Stora Hotellet Bryggan Fjällbacka Open | Bohuslän | 400,000 | (Sweden) Gabriel Axell | NGL |
| 23 May | Trummenäs Open | Blekinge | 350,000 | (Sweden) Simon Forsström | NGL |
| 12 Jun | Österlen PGA Open | Skåne | 400,000 | (Denmark) Patrick Winther | NGL |
| 18 Jun | Nordea Challenge | Norway | €40,000 | (Denmark) Benjamin Poke | NGL |
| 28 Jun | SM Match | Uppland | 400,000 | (Sweden) Björn Hellgren | NGL |
| 3 Jul | Katrineholm Open | Södermanland | 400,000 | (Sweden) Gustav Adell | NGL |
| 31 Jul | Made in Denmark Qualifier | Denmark | DKr 375,000 | (Finland) Tapio Pulkkanen | NGL |
| 8 Aug | Isaberg Open | Småland | 400,000 | (Sweden) Anton Wejshag | NGL |
| 14 Aug | Holtsmark Open | Norway | 400,000 | (Norway) Kristian Krogh Johannessen | NGL |
| 23 Aug | Landeryd Masters | Östergötland | 400,000 | (Sweden) Christopher Lang | NGL |
| 13 Sep | Kristianstad Åhus Open | Skåne | 600,000 | (Finland) Tapio Pulkkanen | NGL |
| 19 Sep | Danæg PGA Championship | Denmark | DKr 337,500 | (Denmark) Nicolai Tinning | NGL |
| 27 Sep | GolfUppsala Open | Uppland | 400,000 | (Sweden) Richard Pettersson | NGL |
| 3 Oct | Race to HimmerLand | Denmark | DKr 375,000 | (Sweden) Christofer Blomstrand | NGL |
| 10 Oct | Tourfinal Vellinge Open | Skåne | 450,000 | (Denmark) Mark Haastrup | NGL |

== Order of Merit ==
The Order of Merit was titled as the Nordea Tour Ranking and was based on tournament results during the season, calculated using a points-based system.

| Position | Player | Points |
|---|---|---|
| 1 | (Sweden) Björn Hellgren | 354,069 |
| 2 | (Norway) Eirik Tage Johansen | 325,216 |
| 3 | (Sweden) Simon Forsström | 294,594 |
| 4 | (Finland) Tapio Pulkkanen | 286,955 |
| 5 | (Sweden) Anton Wejshag | 261,131 |

== See also ==
- 2015 Danish Golf Tour
- 2015 Swedish Golf Tour (women)
