= Malcolm Kokocinski =

Swedish professional golfer

Personal information
- Nationality: Sweden
- Born: 28 July 1991 (age 35) Eslöv, Sweden

Career
- Sport: Golf
- College: College of the Desert
- Turned professional: 2013
- Former tours: Asian Tour; Asian Development Tour; Nordic Golf League; Swedish Golf Tour
- Professional wins: 2

Number of wins by tour
- Asian Tour: 1
- Other: 1

Malcolm Kokocinski (born 28 July 1991) is a Swedish professional golfer. He has played on the Asian Tour where he won the 2018 Bangladesh Open.

== Career ==
Kokocinski was born in Eslöv and started playing golf in the year 2000. As a junior, he appeared for the Swedish National Team in the European Young Masters, the European Nations Cup – Copa Sotogrande, and the Junior Golf World Cup in Japan. He shared training facilities at Eslöv Golf Club with Ludvig Åberg.

After playing college golf at the College of the Desert in Palm Springs, California, Kokocinski became a Thailand-based player attached to Black Mountain Golf Club. Playing primarily on the Asian Development Tour from 2013 to 2018, he racked up 17 top-10 finishes, including 3 runner-up finishes and five 3rd places.

His breakthrough came at the 2016 Shinhan Donghae Open, a co-sanctioned Asian Tour and Korean Tour event, where he tied for 4th with Scott Hend. He made his European Tour debut at the 2016 Nordea Masters, where he finished tied 41st.

In May 2018, he won the Bangladesh Open on the Asian Tour. With the win he rose to 270 on the Official World Golf Ranking. He made eight starts on the 2019 European Tour where he was tied 5th after an opening round of 67 at the AfrAsia Bank Mauritius Open.

After the Asian Tour shut down in March 2020 due to the COVID-19 pandemic, Kokocinski competed the rest of the year on the Nordic Golf League and retired from professional golf at the end of the season.

== Professional wins (2) ==
=== Asian Tour wins (1) ===
No.	Date	Tournament	Winning score	Margin of victory	Runners-up
1	12 May 2018	AB Bank Bangladesh Open	−14 (68-66-71-65=270)	3 strokes	(New Zealand) Ben Campbell, (England) Jack Harrison

=== Swedish Golf Tour wins (1) ===
No.	Date	Tournament	Winning score	Margin of victory	Runners-up
1	23 Apr 2016	Black Mountain Invitational	−8 (71-68-69=208)	3 strokes	(Sweden) Johan Edfors, (Sweden) Tobias Rosendahl

== Team appearances ==
Amateur

- European Young Masters (representing Sweden): 2007
- Junior Golf World Cup (representing Sweden): 2009
- European Nations Cup – Copa Sotogrande (representing Sweden): 2010
