= 2016 Swedish Golf Tour =

Golf tour season

2016 Swedish Golf Tour season
- Duration: 26 February 2016 – 15 October 2016
- Number of official events: 19
- Order of Merit: (Denmark) Mark Haastrup

The 2016 Swedish Golf Tour, titled as the 2016 Nordea Tour for sponsorship reasons, was the 33rd season of the Swedish Golf Tour, the main professional golf tour in Sweden since it was formed in 1984, with most tournaments being incorporated into the Nordic Golf League since 1999.

== Schedule ==
The following table lists official events during the 2016 season.

Date	Tournament	Location	Purse (SKr)	Winner (Note: The number in brackets after each winner's name is the number of Swedish Golf Tour events they had won up to and including that tournament. As most Swedish Golf Tour events are incorporated into the Nordic Golf League schedule, details of these wins are displayed there instead.)	Main tour (Note: NGL − Nordic Golf League.)
28 Feb	Lumine Lakes Open	Spain	€55,000	(Sweden) Björn Hellgren	NGL
4 Mar	Lumine Hills Open	Spain	€55,000	(Finland) Niclas Hellberg	NGL
23 Apr	Black Mountain Invitational	Thailand	405,000	(Sweden) Malcolm Kokocinski (1)	
29 Apr	Grundfos Masters	Germany	€40,000	(Denmark) Oliver Suhr	NGL
21 May	Stora Hotellet Bryggan Fjällbacka Open	Bohuslän	400,000	(Sweden) Per Längfors	NGL
28 May	Trummenäs Open	Blekinge	350,000	(Sweden) Mikael Lindberg	NGL
11 Jun	Österlen PGA Open	Skåne	400,000	(Sweden) Ola Johansson	NGL
23 Jun	Borre Open	Norway	€40,000	(Norway) Jarand Ekeland Arnøy	NGL
2 Jul	SM Match	Uppland	400,000	(Denmark) Mark Haastrup	NGL
9 Jul	Kristianstad Åhus Open	Skåne	600,000	(Sweden) Ola Johansson	NGL
6 Aug	Made in Denmark European Tour Qualifier	Denmark	DKr 300,000	(Denmark) Daniel Løkke	NGL
13 Aug	Isaberg Open	Småland	400,000	(Denmark) Mark Haastrup	NGL
20 Aug	Norwegian Open	Norway	€50,000	(Sweden) Oscar Lengdén	NGL
28 Aug	Landeryd Masters	Östergötland	400,000	(Sweden) Oskar Bergman	NGL
17 Sep	Star for Life Challenge	Skåne	400,000	(Denmark) Mark Haastrup	NGL
23 Sep	Thisted Forsikring Championship	Denmark	DKr 300,000	(Denmark) Kasper Kjær Estrup	NGL
1 Oct	GolfUppsala Open	Uppland	400,000	(Sweden) Niklas Lindström	NGL
8 Oct	Race to HimmerLand	Denmark	DKr 375,000	(Sweden) Alexander Wennstam	NGL
15 Oct	Tourfinal Vellinge Open	Skåne	450,000	(Denmark) Mark Haastrup	NGL

== Order of Merit ==
The Order of Merit was titled as the Nordea Tour Ranking and was based on tournament results during the season, calculated using a points-based system.

Position	Player	Points
1	(Denmark) Mark Haastrup	467,164
2	(Sweden) Alexander Wennstam	278,645
3	(Sweden) Oscar Lengdén	275,783
4	(Sweden) Ola Johansson	254,992
5	(Sweden) Niklas Lindström	222,279

== See also ==
- 2016 Danish Golf Tour
- 2016 Swedish Golf Tour (women)
