= Dubliner =

A Dubliner (pronounced with stress on the first syllable) is a person who comes from Dublin in Ireland.

Dubliner could also refer to one of the following:

- Dubliners, a collection of short stories by James Joyce
- The Dubliners, an Irish folk band
- The Dubliner, a contemporary commentary on Dublin
- Dubliner cheese, a hard cheese produced in Ireland

== See also ==
- Dubliner Challenge, a Swedish golf tournament
