= 2019 Swedish Golf Tour =

Golf tour season

2019 Swedish Golf Tour season
- Duration: 24 February 2019 – 12 October 2019
- Number of official events: 16
- Order of Merit: (Sweden) Christopher Sahlström

The 2019 Swedish Golf Tour was the 36th season of the Swedish Golf Tour, the main professional golf tour in Sweden since it was formed in 1984, with most tournaments being incorporated into the Nordic Golf League since 1999.

== Schedule ==
The following table lists official events during the 2019 season.

Date	Tournament	Location	Purse (SKr)	Winner (Note: The number in brackets after each winner's name is the number of Swedish Golf Tour events they had won up to and including that tournament. As most Swedish Golf Tour events are incorporated into the Nordic Golf League schedule, details of these wins are displayed there instead.)	Main tour (Note: NGL − Nordic Golf League.)
26 Feb	Lumine Hills Open	Spain	550,000	(Spain) Emilio Cuartero	NGL
3 Mar	Lumine Lakes Open	Spain	550,000	(Sweden) Fredrik Niléhn	NGL
18 May	TanumStrand Fjällbacka Open	Bohuslän	450,000	(Sweden) Oliver Gillberg	NGL
24 May	Elisefarm Open	Skåne	350,000	(Sweden) Gustav Adell	NGL
1 Jun	Barsebäck Resort Masters	Skåne	400,000	(Sweden) Christopher Sahlström	NGL
15 Jun	PGA Championship	Skåne	425,000	(Denmark) Christian Bæch Christensen (Iceland) Guðmundur Kristjánsson	NGL
20 Jun	Gamle Fredrikstad Open	Norway	375,000	(Sweden) Åke Nilsson	NGL
6 Jul	Camfil Nordic Championship	Södermanland	400,000	(Sweden) Christopher Sahlström	NGL
12 Jul	Svea Leasing Open	Uppland	400,000	(Iceland) Guðmundur Kristjánsson	NGL
25 Jul	Borre Open	Norway	375,000	(Sweden) Christopher Sahlström	NGL
3 Aug	Bråviken Open	Östergötland	350,000	(Sweden) William Nygård	NGL
9 Aug	Landeryd Masters	Östergötland	400,000	(Sweden) Victor Theandersson	NGL
17 Aug	Åhus KGK ProAm	Skåne	650,000	(Sweden) Jesper Kennegård	NGL
7 Sep	SM Match	Uppland	400,000	(Sweden) Oliver Gillberg	NGL
27 Sep	Lindbytvätten Masters	Öland	400,000	(Sweden) Tobias Ruth	NGL
12 Oct	Tour Final	Estonia	350,000	(Sweden) Mikael Lindberg	NGL

== Order of Merit ==
The Order of Merit was based on tournament results during the season, calculated using a points-based system.

Position	Player	Points
1	(Sweden) Christopher Sahlström	339,258
2	(Denmark) Niklas Nørgaard	322,665
3	(Sweden) Oliver Gillberg	209,183
4	(Iceland) Haraldur Magnús	197,462
5	(Sweden) Åke Nilsson	197,373

== See also ==
- 2019 Danish Golf Tour
- 2019 Swedish Golf Tour (women)
