= Oliver Hundebøll =

Danish professional golfer (born 1999)

Personal information
- Full name: Oliver Hundebøll Jørgensen
- Nationality: Denmark
- Born: 19 April 1999 (age 27) Silkeborg, Denmark

Career
- Sport: Golf
- Turned professional: 2019
- Current tour: European Tour
- Former tours: Challenge Tour; Nordic Golf League
- Professional wins: 3

Number of wins by tour
- Sunshine Tour: 1
- Challenge Tour: 1
- Other: 2

Oliver Hundebøll Jørgensen (born 19 April 1999) is a Danish professional golfer. In 2022, he won the Mangaung Open, a co-sanctioned Challenge Tour and Sunshine Tour event.

== Career ==
Hundebøll is from Silkeborg, and has since he was 8 years old been playing for Silkeborg Ry Golf Club, a club that also fostered Thomas Bjørn.

As an amateur, Hundebøll won the DGU Elite Tour I in 2016 and 2018. Representing the Danish National Team he won the European Boys' Team Championship in 2017.

Hundebøll turned professional in early 2019 and joined the 2019 Nordic Golf League (NGL), where he recorded one victory his rookie year. He also made seven starts on the 2019 Challenge Tour where hist best finish was a solo 3rd at the Lalla Aïcha Challenge Tour held at Royal Golf Dar Es Salam in Morocco. In 2021 he made 16 starts and 12 cuts on the Challenge Tour, with best result a tie for 5th at the Dormy Open held at Österåker Golf Club in Sweden.

Hundebøll won his first Challenge Tour title at the 2022 Mangaung Open at Bloemfontein Golf Club in South Africa. He came from five strokes behind on the final day to secure victory in difficult conditions after a birdie on the final hole.

== Amateur wins ==
- 2016 DGU Elite Tour I
- 2018 DGU Elite Tour I

== Professional wins (3) ==
=== Sunshine Tour wins (1) ===
No.	Date	Tournament	Winning score	Margin of victory	Runners-up
1	6 Mar 2022	Mangaung Open^{1}	−21 (68-67-66-66=267)	1 stroke	(South Africa) Luke Jerling, (South Africa) Tristen Strydom

^{1}Co-sanctioned by the Challenge Tour

=== Challenge Tour wins (1) ===
No.	Date	Tournament	Winning score	Margin of victory	Runners-up
1	6 Mar 2022	Mangaung Open^{1}	−21 (68-67-66-66=267)	1 stroke	(South Africa) Luke Jerling, (South Africa) Tristen Strydom

^{1}Co-sanctioned by the Sunshine Tour

Challenge Tour playoff record (0–1)

No.	Year	Tournament	Opponent	Result
1	2022	Italian Challenge Open	(Norway) Kristian Krogh Johannessen	Lost to par on first extra hole

=== Nordic Golf League wins (2) ===
No.	Date	Tournament	Winning score	Margin of victory	Runners-up
1	10 May 2019	Jyske Bank Made in Denmark Qualifier	−17 (64-67-68=199)	2 strokes	(Sweden) Oskar Bergman, (Norway) Elias Bertheussen
2	25 Feb 2025	Infinitum Spanish Masters	−13 (62-70-66=198)	Playoff	(Italy) Edoardo Molinari, (Sweden) Albin Tidén

== Team appearances ==
Amateur

- European Boys' Team Championship (representing Denmark): 2017 (winners)

== See also ==
- 2022 Challenge Tour graduates
