= Oliver Gillberg =

Swedish professional golfer (born 1996)

Personal information
- Full name: Lars Oliver Gillberg
- Nationality: Sweden
- Born: 18 October 1996 (age 30) Örebro, Sweden

Career
- Sport: Golf
- Turned professional: 2018
- Current tour: Challenge Tour
- Former tours: Nordic Golf League; Swedish Golf Tour
- Professional wins: 7

Achievements and awards
- PGA of Sweden Future Fund Award: 2025

Oliver Gillberg (born 18 October 1996) is a Swedish professional golfer and Challenge Tour player. He won the Swedish Matchplay Championship twice, in 2019 and 2024.

== Early life and amateur career ==
Gillberg got his first golf club when he turned one, and was coached by his father, a teaching pro at Askersund Golf Club. He won several titles on the junior Skandia Tour and finished 4th at Swedish Junior Strokeplay Championship in 2015, and 4th again in 2016, three strokes behind winner Jesper Svensson.

In 2016, he joined the Nordic Golf League while still an amateur, where he recorded six top-12 finishes, including a runner-up at the Finnish Open at Åland Golf Club. In 2017, he finished 4th individually at the European Nations Cup – Copa Sotogrande.

In 2018, Gillberg won the South African Stroke Play Championship at Pecanwood Golf Estate, a stroke ahead of Matt Saulez and two ahead of Wilco Nienaber.

He appeared for Sweden at the 2018 Eisenhower Trophy in Ireland, and at the 2018 European Amateur Team Championship in Germany alongside David Nyfjäll, Pontus Nyholm, Jesper Svensson, Tim Widing and Ludvig Åberg, where they led the strokeplay ahead of England but lost in the quarterfinal to eventual winners Finland.

Gillberg rose to a career-high of 7th in the World Amateur Golf Ranking, and topped the European Amateur Golf Ranking.

== Professional career ==
Gillberg turned professional in late 2018, and won twice on the Nordic Golf League in 2019, to finish 3rd in the 2019 Swedish Golf Tour Order of Merit.

He was runner-up at the 2023 Swedish PGA Championship, and won the Swedish Matchplay Championship twice, in 2019 at Österåker Golf Club and in 2024 at Rya Golf Club.

After five top-3 finishes, he ended the 2024 Nordic Golf League season 6th in the Order of Merit and graduated to the Challenge Tour for 2025.

In his first 2025 Challenge Tour start, at the Challenge de España, Gillberg shared the halfway lead with Luis Masaveu and ultimately tied for 8th.

== Amateur wins ==
- 2009 Skandia Tour Närke #2
- 2010 Skandia Cup Riksfinal
- 2012 Juniorslaget
- 2013 Skandia Tour Riks #3 Stockholm
- 2015 McDonald's Junior Cup
- 2018 South African Stroke Play Championship

== Professional wins (7) ==
=== Nordic Golf League wins (5) ===
No.	Date	Tournament	Winning score	Margin of victory	Runner(s)-up
1	18 May 2019	TanumStrand Fjällbacka Open	−15 (67-67-67=201)	3 strokes	(Sweden) Gustav Adell, (Denmark) Niklas Nørgaard
2	7 Sep 2019	SM Match	19 holes		(Sweden) Christopher Feldborg Nielsen
3	25 May 2023	Gamla Fredrikstad Open	−11 (66-69-70=205)	1 stroke	(Iceland) Bjarki Pétursson
4	6 Sep 2024	SM Match (2)	20 holes		(Sweden) Simon Hovdal (a)
5	19 Sep 2024	Great Northern Challenge	−14 (65-69-68=202)	2 strokes	(Sweden) Adam Guedra, (Denmark) Bjørn La Cour Søborg

=== Swedish Future Series wins (2) ===
No.	Date	Tournament	Winning score	Margin of victory	Runner(s)-up
1	27 Aug 2018	Kårsta Open - Oakley Tour (as an amateur)	−16 (66-62=128)	6 strokes	(Sweden) Andreas Grönkvist, (Sweden) Kristoffer Karlsson
2	22 Apr 2019	Tomelilla Open	−6 (70-68=138)	4 strokes	(Sweden) Christopher Sahlström

== Team appearances ==
Amateur

- European Nations Cup – Copa Sotogrande (representing Sweden): 2017, 2018
- Bonallack Trophy (representing Europe): 2018
- Eisenhower Trophy (representing Sweden): 2018
- European Amateur Team Championship (representing Sweden): 2018
