= Shankai Classic =

Tournament information
- Location: Chongqing, China
- Established: 2014
- Course: Chongqing Poly Golf Club
- Par: 72
- Length: 7,294 yards (6,670 m)
- Tour: Challenge Tour
- Format: Stroke play
- Prize fund: US$350,000
- Month played: October
- Final year: 2014

Tournament record score
- Aggregate: 201 Johan Edfors (2014)
- To par: −15 as above

Final champion
- (Sweden) Johan Edfors
- Location in China

The Shankai Classic, known for sponsorship reasons as the Shankai Classic presented by IDG, was a golf tournament on the Challenge Tour. It was first played in October 2014 at Chongqing Poly Golf Club in Chongqing, China.

== Winners ==
Year	Winner	Score	To par	Margin of victory	Runner-up	Ref.
2014	(Sweden) Johan Edfors	201 (Note: Shortened to 54 holes due to weather.)	−15	3 strokes	(France) Mike Lorenzo-Vera	
