= 2013 Nordic Golf League =

Golf tour season

2013 Nordic Golf League season
- Duration: 15 March 2013 – 5 October 2013
- Number of official events: 24
- Most wins: (Sweden) Jesper Kennegård (3)
- Order of Merit: (Sweden) Jesper Kennegård

The 2013 Nordic Golf League was the 15th season of the Nordic Golf League, a third-tier tour recognised by the European Tour.

== Schedule ==
The following table lists official events during the 2013 season.

| Date | Tournament | Host country | Purse | Winner (Note: The number in brackets after each winner's name is the number of Nordic Golf League events they had won up to and including that tournament. It is rare for someone to accumulate many wins on the Nordic Golf League as success at this level usually leads to promotion to the Challenge Tour.) |
|---|---|---|---|---|
| 17 Mar | Mediter Real Estate Masters | Spain | €40,000 | (Sweden) Richard Pettersson (1) |
| 22 Mar | ECCO Spanish Open | Spain | €40,000 | (Denmark) Lucas Bjerregaard (3) |
| 27 Apr | PEAB PGA Grand Opening | Sweden | SKr 500,000 | (Sweden) Niklas Bruzelius (6) |
| 4 May | Freja Championship | Denmark | DKr 300,000 | (Sweden) Jesper Kennegård (1) |
| 11 May | DAT Masters | Denmark | DKr 300,000 | (Denmark) Morten Ørum Madsen (3) |
| 24 May | Landskrona Masters | Sweden | SKr 400,000 | (Sweden) Tony Edlund (6) |
| 1 Jun | Bravo Tours Open | Denmark | DKr 300,000 | (Denmark) Jeff Winther (2) |
| 7 Jun | Samsø Pro-Am Classic | Denmark | DKr 300,000 | (Sweden) Richard Pettersson (2) |
| 15 Jun | Wisby Open | Sweden | SKr 400,000 | (Sweden) Jesper Kennegård (2) |
| 20 Jun | Nordea Challenge | Norway | SKr 350,000 | (Sweden) Anton Wejshag (1) |
| 28 Jun | Mercedes-Benz Matchplay | Denmark | DKr 300,000 | (Sweden) Joakim Rask (8) |
| 5 Jul | Katrineholm Open | Sweden | SKr 350,000 | (Sweden) Joakim Wikström (1) |
| 14 Jul | Gant Open | Finland | €40,000 | (Sweden) Patrik Sjöland (2) |
| 27 Jul | Finnish Open | Finland | €60,000 | (Denmark) Kasper Kjær Estrup (1) |
| 2 Aug | Mørk Masters | Norway | €50,000 | (Estonia) Mark Suursalu (1) |
| 3 Aug | SM Match | Sweden | SKr 250,000 | (Sweden) Jesper Kennegård (3) |
| 10 Aug | Isaberg Open | Sweden | SKr 300,000 | (Sweden) Joakim Lagergren (3) |
| 17 Aug | ECCO Tournament of Champions | Denmark | DKr 300,000 | (Denmark) Jeff Winther (3) |
| 25 Aug | Landeryd Masters | Sweden | SKr 450,000 | (Sweden) Björn Hellgren (1) |
| 6 Sep | Willis Masters | Denmark | DKr 300,000 | (Sweden) Sebastian Söderberg (1) |
| 13 Sep | Arlandastad MoreGolf Open | Sweden | SKr 400,000 | (Sweden) Alexander Björk (2) |
| 20 Sep | Actona PGA Championship | Denmark | DKr 375,000 | (Sweden) Sebastian Söderberg (2) |
| 28 Sep | Tourfinal Svedala Open | Sweden | SKr 450,000 | (Sweden) Jesper Billing (2) |
| 5 Oct | Backtee Race to HimmerLand | Denmark | DKr 450,000 | (Denmark) Lasse Jensen (4) |

== Order of Merit ==
The Order of Merit was titled as the Road to Europe and was based on tournament results during the season, calculated using a points-based system. The top five players on the Order of Merit (not otherwise exempt) earned status to play on the 2014 Challenge Tour.

| Position | Player | Points | Status earned |
|---|---|---|---|
| 1 | (Sweden) Jesper Kennegård | 46,591 | Promoted to Challenge Tour |
| 2 | (Sweden) Niclas Johansson | 32,155 | Promoted to Challenge Tour |
| 3 | (Denmark) Jeff Winther | 30,173 | Promoted to Challenge Tour |
| 4 | (Sweden) Patrik Sjöland | 29,633 | Qualified for European Tour (Top 25 in Q School) |
| 5 | (Sweden) Joakim Rask | 28,525 | Promoted to Challenge Tour |
| 6 | (Sweden) Alexander Björk | 28,350 | Promoted to Challenge Tour |
| 7 | (Sweden) Jesper Billing | 26,401 | |
| 8 | (Sweden) Richard Pettersson | 25,817 | |
| 9 | (Denmark) Anders Schmidt Hansen | 20,357 | |
| 10 | (Sweden) Alexander Jacobsson | 20,030 | |

== See also ==
- 2013 Danish Golf Tour
- 2013 Swedish Golf Tour
