= 2019 Nordic Golf League =

Golf tour season

2019 Nordic Golf League season
- Duration: 12 February 2019 – 12 October 2019
- Number of official events: 27
- Most wins: (Sweden) Christopher Sahlström (4)
- Order of Merit: (Denmark) Niklas Nørgaard

The 2019 Nordic Golf League was the 21st season of the Nordic Golf League, a third-tier tour recognised by the European Tour.

== Schedule ==
The following table lists official events during the 2019 season.

Date	Tournament	Host country	Purse	Winner (Note: The number in brackets after each winner's name is the number of Nordic Golf League events they had won up to and including that tournament. It is rare for someone to accumulate many wins on the Nordic Golf League as success at this level usually leads to promotion to the Challenge Tour.)	OWGR points
14 Feb	Mediter Real Estate Masters	Spain	DKr 375,000	(Iceland) Guðmundur Kristjánsson (1)	4
19 Feb	PGA Catalunya Resort Championship	Spain	DKr 375,000	(Denmark) Morten Ørum Madsen (4)	4
26 Feb	Lumine Hills Open	Spain	SKr 550,000	(Spain) Emilio Cuartero (1)	4
3 Mar	Lumine Lakes Open	Spain	SKr 550,000	(Sweden) Fredrik Niléhn (1)	4
27 Apr	Master of the Monster	Germany	€30,000	(Denmark) Nicolai Kristensen (3)	4
3 May	Bravo Tours Open	Denmark	DKr 300,000	(Sweden) Niclas Johansson (1)	4
10 May	Jyske Bank Made in Denmark Qualifier	Denmark	DKr 300,000	(Denmark) Oliver Hundebøll (1)	4
18 May	TanumStrand Fjällbacka Open	Sweden	SKr 450,000	(Sweden) Oliver Gillberg (1)	4
24 May	Elisefarm Open	Sweden	SKr 350,000	(Sweden) Gustav Adell (6)	4
1 Jun	Barsebäck Resort Masters	Sweden	SKr 400,000	(Sweden) Christopher Sahlström (1)	4
7 Jun	Thisted Forsikring Championship	Denmark	DKr 300,000	(Sweden) Alexander Wennstam (2)	4
15 Jun	PGA Championship	Sweden	SKr 425,000	(Denmark) Christian Bæch Christensen (1) (Iceland) Guðmundur Kristjánsson (2)	4 (Note: Title shared after the tournament ended after the third playoff hole due to unsafe weather conditions. Christensen and Kristjánsson tied for the lowest score and split the assigned points for first and second places, each earning 3.2 points.)
20 Jun	Gamle Fredrikstad Open	Norway	SKr 375,000	(Sweden) Åke Nilsson (8)	4
28 Jun	Tinderbox Charity Challenge	Denmark	DKr 300,000	(Sweden) Christopher Sahlström (2)	4
6 Jul	Camfil Nordic Championship	Sweden	SKr 400,000	(Sweden) Christopher Sahlström (3)	4
12 Jul	Svea Leasing Open	Sweden	SKr 400,000	(Iceland) Guðmundur Kristjánsson (3)	4
25 Jul	Borre Open	Norway	SKr 375,000	(Sweden) Christopher Sahlström (4)	4
3 Aug	Bråviken Open	Sweden	SKr 350,000	(Sweden) William Nygård (1)	4
9 Aug	Landeryd Masters	Sweden	SKr 400,000	(Sweden) Victor Theandersson (1)	4
17 Aug	Åhus KGK Pro-Am	Sweden	SKr 650,000	(Sweden) Jesper Kennegård (4)	4
23 Aug	Esbjerg Open	Denmark	DKr 300,000	(Norway) Elias Bertheussen (4)	4
31 Aug	Timberwise Finnish Open	Finland	€55,000	(Sweden) Anton Wilbertsson (1)	4
7 Sep	SM Match	Sweden	SKr 400,000	(Sweden) Oliver Gillberg (2)	6
20 Sep	Willis Towers Watson Masters	Denmark	DKr 300,000	(Denmark) Andreas Lunding (1)	4
27 Sep	Lindbytvätten Masters	Sweden	SKr 400,000	(Sweden) Tobias Ruth (1)	4
6 Oct	Race to HimmerLand	Denmark	DKr 300,000	(Denmark) Niklas Nørgaard (2)	4
12 Oct	Tour Final	Estonia	SKr 350,000	(Sweden) Mikael Lindberg (2)	4

== Order of Merit ==
The Order of Merit was titled as the GolfBox Road to Europe and was based on tournament results during the season, calculated using a points-based system. The top five players on the Order of Merit earned status to play on the 2020 Challenge Tour. (Note: Despite finishing outside the top five on the Order of Merit; Kristjánsson also earned promotion to the Challenge Tour by winning three times during the 2019 Nordic Golf League season.)

Position	Player	Points	Status earned
1	(Denmark) Niklas Nørgaard	47,891	Promoted to Challenge Tour
2	(Sweden) Christopher Sahlström	41,740	Promoted to Challenge Tour
3	(Norway) Elias Bertheussen	37,627	Promoted to Challenge Tour
4	(Iceland) Haraldur Magnús	33,704	Promoted to Challenge Tour
5	(Denmark) Nicolai Kristensen	31,050	Promoted to Challenge Tour
6	(Iceland) Guðmundur Kristjánsson	27,165	Promoted to Challenge Tour
7	(Norway) Jarand Ekeland Arnøy	24,624	
8	(Sweden) Fredrik Niléhn	24,102	
9	(Sweden) Åke Nilsson	22,993	
10	(Sweden) Christopher Feldborg Nielsen	21,389	

== See also ==
- 2019 Danish Golf Tour
- 2019 Swedish Golf Tour
