= 2016 Nordic Golf League =

Golf tour season

2016 Nordic Golf League season
- Duration: 26 February 2016 – 15 October 2016
- Number of official events: 26
- Most wins: (Denmark) Mark Haastrup (4)
- Order of Merit: (Denmark) Mark Haastrup

The 2016 Nordic Golf League was the 18th season of the Nordic Golf League, a third-tier tour recognised by the European Tour.

== Schedule ==
The following table lists official events during the 2016 season.

Date	Tournament	Host country	Purse	Winner (Note: The number in brackets after each winner's name is the number of Nordic Golf League events they had won up to and including that tournament. It is rare for someone to accumulate many wins on the Nordic Golf League as success at this level usually leads to promotion to the Challenge Tour.)	OWGR points
28 Feb	Lumine Lakes Open	Spain	€55,000	(Sweden) Björn Hellgren (3)	4
4 Mar	Lumine Hills Open	Spain	€55,000	(Finland) Niclas Hellberg (1)	4
15 Mar	Mediter Real Estate Masters	Spain	DKr 375,000	(Denmark) Benjamin Poke (2)	4
20 Mar	PGA Catalunya Resort Championship	Spain	DKr 375,000	(Denmark) Rasmus Hjelm Nielsen (3)	4
29 Apr	Grundfos Masters	Germany	€40,000	(Denmark) Oliver Suhr (2)	4
6 May	Kitchen Joy Championship	Denmark	€40,000	(Finland) Oliver Lindell (2)	4
13 May	Kellers Park Masters	Denmark	€50,000	(Finland) Erik Myllymäki (1)	4
21 May	Stora Hotellet Bryggan Fjällbacka Open	Sweden	SKr 400,000	(Sweden) Per Längfors (1)	4
28 May	Trummenäs Open	Sweden	SKr 350,000	(Sweden) Mikael Lindberg (1)	4
4 Jun	Jyske Bank PGA Championship	Denmark	DKr 375,000	(Denmark) Rasmus Hjelm Nielsen (4)	4
11 Jun	Österlen PGA Open	Sweden	SKr 400,000	(Sweden) Ola Johansson (1)	4
18 Jun	NorthSide Charity Challenge	Denmark	€70,000	(Finland) Oliver Lindell (3)	4
23 Jun	Borre Open	Norway	€40,000	(Norway) Jarand Ekeland Arnøy (1)	4
2 Jul	SM Match	Sweden	SKr 400,000	(Denmark) Mark Haastrup (3)	4
9 Jul	Kristianstad Åhus Open	Sweden	SKr 600,000	(Sweden) Ola Johansson (2)	4
6 Aug	Made in Denmark European Tour Qualifier	Denmark	DKr 300,000	(Denmark) Daniel Løkke (2)	4
13 Aug	Isaberg Open	Sweden	SKr 400,000	(Denmark) Mark Haastrup (4)	4
20 Aug	Norwegian Open	Norway	€50,000	(Sweden) Oscar Lengdén (1)	4
28 Aug	Landeryd Masters	Sweden	SKr 400,000	(Sweden) Oskar Bergman (2)	4
2 Sep	Ålandsbanken Finnish Open	Finland	€50,000	(Denmark) Jesper Lerchedahl (1)	4
10 Sep	Willis Towers Watson Masters	Denmark	DKr 300,000	(Denmark) Mathias Gladbjerg (1)	4
17 Sep	Star for Life Challenge	Sweden	SKr 400,000	(Denmark) Mark Haastrup (5)	4
23 Sep	Thisted Forsikring Championship	Denmark	DKr 300,000	(Denmark) Kasper Kjær Estrup (2)	4
1 Oct	GolfUppsala Open	Sweden	SKr 400,000	(Sweden) Niklas Lindström (1)	4
8 Oct	Race to HimmerLand	Denmark	DKr 375,000	(Sweden) Alexander Wennstam (1)	4
15 Oct	Tourfinal Vellinge Open	Sweden	SKr 450,000	(Denmark) Mark Haastrup (6)	4

== Order of Merit ==
The Order of Merit was titled as the Road to Europe and was based on tournament results during the season, calculated using a points-based system. The top five players on the Order of Merit (not otherwise exempt) earned status to play on the 2017 Challenge Tour.

Position	Player	Points	Status earned
1	(Denmark) Mark Haastrup	54,619	Promoted to Challenge Tour
2	(Finland) Oliver Lindell	47,378	Promoted to Challenge Tour
3	(Sweden) Oscar Lengdén	37,836	Qualified for Challenge Tour (made cut in Q School)
4	(Sweden) Alexander Wennstam	36,827	Promoted to Challenge Tour
5	(Denmark) Rasmus Hjelm Nielsen	35,968	Promoted to Challenge Tour
6	(Sweden) Niklas Lindström	30,148	Promoted to Challenge Tour
7	(Norway) Christian Aronsen	29,675	
8	(Sweden) Ola Johannson	25,981	
9	(Sweden) Mikael Lindberg	25,339	
10	(Sweden) Tobias Rosendahl	25,197	

== See also ==
- 2016 Danish Golf Tour
- 2016 Swedish Golf Tour
