= Félix Mory =

French professional golfer (born 1994)

Personal information
- Nationality: France
- Born: 11 September 1994 (age 32) Bourghelles, France
- Height: 6 ft 1 in (185 cm)

Career
- Sport: Golf
- College: California State University, Northridge; Santa Barbara City College
- Turned professional: 2018
- Current tour: Challenge Tour
- Former tour: Pro Golf Tour
- Professional wins: 2

Number of wins by tour
- Challenge Tour: 2

Achievements and awards
- Santa Barbara Athlete of the Year: 2013–14
- Big West Player of the Year: 2017–18

Félix Mory (born 11 September 1994) is a French professional golfer who plays on the Challenge Tour. He won the 2021 Dormy Open in Sweden.

== Amateur career ==
Mory spent two seasons at Santa Barbara City College where he finished second at the Southern California Championship. He earned first team All-Western State Conference honors after finishing third in the conference, and was named Santa Barbara Athlete of the Year.

Mory transferred to California State University, Northridge in 2015 and joined the Cal State Northridge Matadors men's golf team. He was the Big West Conference Individual Champion 2016–17, First Team All-Big West 2016–17 and 2017–18, and Big West Men's Golf Player of the Year 2017–18.

== Professional career ==
Mory turned professional in 2018 and joined the 2019 Pro Golf Tour, where he finished 8th in the Order of Merit to gain promotion to the 2020 Challenge Tour. In 2021, he won the Dormy Open after winning a playoff against Björn Hellgren.

== Amateur wins ==
- 2012 Coupe Wallaert Devilder
- 2013 Grand Prix Wallaert Devilder
- 2016 OGIO UC Santa Barbara Intercollegiate

== Professional wins (2) ==
=== Challenge Tour wins (2) ===
No.	Date	Tournament	Winning score	Margin of victory	Runner-up
1	22 May 2021	Dormy Open	−15 (69-64-66-74=273)	Playoff	(Sweden) Björn Hellgren
2	8 Jun 2025	Swiss Challenge	−12 (67-68-68-69=272)	Playoff	(Spain) Santiago Tarrío

Challenge Tour playoff record (2–1)

No.	Year	Tournament	Opponent(s)	Result
1	2021	Dormy Open	(Sweden) Björn Hellgren	Won with birdie on second extra hole
2	2022	Open de Portugal	(France) Pierre Pineau, (France) David Ravetto	Pineau won with eagle on first extra hole
3	2025	Swiss Challenge	(Spain) Santiago Tarrío	Won with birdie on first extra hole

== See also ==
- 2025 Challenge Tour graduates
