= 2015 Nordic Golf League =

Golf tour season

2015 Nordic Golf League season
- Duration: 21 February 2015 – 10 October 2015
- Number of official events: 28
- Most wins: (Finland) Tapio Pulkkanen (5)
- Order of Merit: (Finland) Tapio Pulkkanen

The 2015 Nordic Golf League was the 17th season of the Nordic Golf League, a third-tier tour recognised by the European Tour.

== OWGR inclusion ==
In July, it was announced that all Nordic Golf League events, beginning with the Master Promo Championship, would receive Official World Golf Ranking points at the minimum level of 4 points for the winner of a 54-hole event.

== Schedule ==
The following table lists official events during the 2015 season.

Date	Tournament	Host country	Purse	Winner (Note: The number in brackets after each winner's name is the number of Nordic Golf League events they had won up to and including that tournament. It is rare for someone to accumulate many wins on the Nordic Golf League as success at this level usually leads to promotion to the Challenge Tour.)	OWGR points
23 Feb	Lumine Lakes Open	Spain	€55,000	(Denmark) Peter Vejgaard (1)	n/a
28 Feb	Lumine Hills Open	Spain	€55,000	(Norway) Eirik Tage Johansen (4)	n/a
12 Mar	Mediter Real Estate Masters	Spain	DKr 375,000	(Sweden) Daniel Jennevret (2)	n/a
17 Mar	PGA Catalunya Resort Championship	Spain	DKr 375,000	(Sweden) Åke Nilsson (5)	n/a
1 May	Bravo Tours Open	Denmark	DKr 300,000	(Denmark) Daniel Løkke (1)	n/a
8 May	NorthSide Charity Challenge	Denmark	DKr 400,000	(Finland) Tapio Pulkkanen (4)	n/a
13 May	Stora Hotellet Bryggan Fjällbacka Open	Sweden	SKr 400,000	(Sweden) Gabriel Axell (1)	n/a
23 May	Trummenäs Open	Sweden	SKr 350,000	(Sweden) Simon Forsström (1)	n/a
30 May	Kitchen Joy Championship	Denmark	DKr 300,000	(Sweden) Per Barth (3)	n/a
5 Jun	Thisted Forsikring Championship	Denmark	DKr 375,000	(Sweden) Eric Blom (1)	n/a
12 Jun	Österlen PGA Open	Sweden	SKr 400,000	(Denmark) Patrick Winther (1)	n/a
18 Jun	Nordea Challenge	Norway	€40,000	(Denmark) Benjamin Poke (1)	n/a
26 Jun	ECCO German Masters	Germany	€45,000	(Finland) Tapio Pulkkanen (5)	n/a
28 Jun	SM Match	Sweden	SKr 400,000	(Sweden) Björn Hellgren (2)	n/a
3 Jul	Katrineholm Open	Sweden	SKr 400,000	(Sweden) Gustav Adell (4)	n/a
12 Jul	Finnish Open	Finland	€50,000	(Finland) Tapio Pulkkanen (6)	n/a
25 Jul	Master Promo Championship	Finland	€40,000	(Finland) Oliver Lindell (a) (1)	4
31 Jul	Made in Denmark Qualifier	Denmark	DKr 375,000	(Finland) Tapio Pulkkanen (7)	4
8 Aug	Isaberg Open	Sweden	SKr 400,000	(Sweden) Anton Wejshag (2)	4
14 Aug	Holtsmark Open	Norway	SKr 400,000	(Norway) Kristian Krogh Johannessen (1)	4
23 Aug	Landeryd Masters	Sweden	SKr 400,000	(Sweden) Christopher Lang (1)	4
29 Aug	K-Supermarket Kamppi Open	Finland	€30,000	(Norway) Kristian Krogh Johannessen (2)	4
4 Sep	Willis Masters	Denmark	DKr 300,000	(Sweden) Daniel Jennevret (3)	4
13 Sep	Kristianstad Åhus Open	Sweden	SKr 600,000	(Finland) Tapio Pulkkanen (8)	4
19 Sep	Danæg PGA Championship	Denmark	DKr 337,500	(Denmark) Nicolai Tinning (1)	4
27 Sep	GolfUppsala Open	Sweden	SKr 400,000	(Sweden) Richard Pettersson (3)	4
3 Oct	Race to HimmerLand	Denmark	DKr 375,000	(Sweden) Christofer Blomstrand (1)	4
10 Oct	Tourfinal Vellinge Open	Sweden	SKr 450,000	(Denmark) Mark Haastrup (2)	4

== Order of Merit ==
The Order of Merit was titled as the Road to Europe and was based on tournament results during the season, calculated using a points-based system. The top five players on the Order of Merit earned status to play on the 2016 Challenge Tour.

Position	Player	Points	Status earned
1	(Finland) Tapio Pulkkanen	62,652	Promoted to Challenge Tour
2	(Norway) Eirik Tage Johansen	42,785	Promoted to Challenge Tour
3	(Sweden) Eric Blom	38,191	Promoted to Challenge Tour
4	(Norway) Kristian Krogh Johannessen	35,803	Promoted to Challenge Tour
5	(Sweden) Simon Forsström	34,005	Promoted to Challenge Tour
6	(Denmark) Daniel Løkke	33,187	
7	(Sweden) Björn Hellgren	32,650	
8	(Denmark) Rasmus Hjelm Nielsen	31,273	
9	(Denmark) Peter Vejgaard	26,863	
10	(Sweden) Daniel Jennevret	26,586	

== See also ==
- 2015 Danish Golf Tour
- 2015 Swedish Golf Tour
