= Black Mountain Invitational =

Golf tournament on the Swedish Golf Tour

Tournament information
- Location: Hua Hin, Thailand
- Established: 2013
- Course: Black Mountain Golf Club
- Par: 72
- Length: 7,389 yards (6,757 m)
- Tour: Swedish Golf Tour
- Format: Stroke play
- Prize fund: kr 405,000
- Month played: April
- Final year: 2016

Tournament record score
- Aggregate: 203 Björn Hellgren (2014)
- To par: −13 as above

Final champion
- (Sweden) Malcolm Kokocinski

Location map
- Location in Thailand

The Black Mountain Invitational was a golf tournament on the Swedish Golf Tour played at the Black Mountain Golf Club in Hua Hin, Thailand, between 2013 and 2016.

A pre-season limited field-event, it featured the top 20 players from the previous season's Swedish Golf Tour Order of Merit and a further six invitees. It was not part of the Nordic Golf League.

== Winners ==
Year	Winner	Score	To par	Margin of victory	Runner(s)-up	Ref.
2016	(Sweden) Malcolm Kokocinski	208	−8	3 strokes	(Sweden) Johan Edfors (Sweden) Tobias Rosendahl	
2015	(Sweden) Björn Hellgren (2)	210	−6	1 stroke	(Sweden) Daniel Jennevret (Sweden) David Palm	
2014	(Sweden) Björn Hellgren	203	−13	4 strokes	(Sweden) Sebastian Söderberg	
2013	(Sweden) Johan Edfors	206	−10	2 strokes	(Sweden) Jacob Glennemo	
