= 2013 Swedish Golf Tour =

Golf tour season

2013 Swedish Golf Tour season
- Duration: 4 April 2013 – 28 September 2013
- Number of official events: 14
- Order of Merit: (Sweden) Jesper Kennegård

The 2013 Swedish Golf Tour, titled as the 2013 Nordea Tour for sponsorship reasons, was the 30th season of the Swedish Golf Tour, the main professional golf tour in Sweden since it was formed in 1984, with most tournaments being incorporated into the Nordic Golf League since 1999.

== Schedule ==
The following table lists official events during the 2013 season.

Date	Tournament	Location	Purse (SKr)	Winner (Note: The number in brackets after each winner's name is the number of Swedish Golf Tour events they had won up to and including that tournament. As most Swedish Golf Tour events are incorporated into the Nordic Golf League schedule, details of these wins are displayed there instead.)	Main tour (Note: NGL − Nordic Golf League.)
6 Apr	Black Mountain Invitational	Thailand	350,000	(Sweden) Johan Edfors (1)	
27 Apr	PEAB PGA Grand Opening	Skåne	500,000	(Sweden) Niklas Bruzelius	NGL
24 May	Landskrona Masters	Skåne	400,000	(Sweden) Tony Edlund	NGL
1 Jun	Bravo Tours Open	Denmark	DKr 300,000	(Denmark) Jeff Winther	NGL
15 Jun	Wisby Open	Gotland	400,000	(Sweden) Jesper Kennegård	NGL
20 Jun	Nordea Challenge	Norway	350,000	(Sweden) Anton Wejshag	NGL
5 Jul	Katrineholm Open	Södermanland	350,000	(Sweden) Joakim Wikström	NGL
14 Jul	Gant Open	Finland	€40,000	(Sweden) Patrik Sjöland	NGL
3 Aug	SM Match	Uppland	250,000	(Sweden) Jesper Kennegård	NGL
10 Aug	Isaberg Open	Småland	300,000	(Sweden) Joakim Lagergren	NGL
25 Aug	Landeryd Masters	Östergötland	450,000	(Sweden) Björn Hellgren	NGL
6 Sep	Willis Masters	Denmark	DKr 300,000	(Sweden) Sebastian Söderberg	NGL
13 Sep	Arlandastad MoreGolf Open	Uppland	400,000	(Sweden) Alexander Björk	NGL
28 Sep	Tourfinal Svedala Open	Skåne	450,000	(Sweden) Jesper Billing	NGL

== Order of Merit ==
The Order of Merit was titled as the Nordea Tour Ranking and was based on tournament results during the season, calculated using a points-based system.

Position	Player	Points
1	(Sweden) Jesper Kennegård	290,476
2	(Sweden) Jesper Billing	204,656
3	(Sweden) Patrik Sjöland	191,876
4	(Sweden) Gustav Adell	143,562
5	(Sweden) Alexander Björk	139,703

== See also ==
- 2013 Danish Golf Tour
- 2013 Swedish Golf Tour (women)
