= Black Mountain Masters =

Tournament information
- Location: Hua Hin, Thailand
- Established: 2009
- Course: Black Mountain Golf Club
- Par: 72
- Length: 7,389 yards (6,757 m)
- Tour: Asian Tour
- Format: Stroke play
- Prize fund: US$600,000
- Month played: March
- Final year: 2010

Tournament record score
- Aggregate: 271 Johan Edfors (2009)
- To par: −17 as above

Final champion
- (Japan) Tetsuji Hiratsuka
- Location in Thailand

The Black Mountain Masters was a golf tournament on the Asian Tour, played in Thailand. The inaugural tournament was held in 2009 at the Black Mountain Golf Club and the prize fund was US$500,000. Johan Edfors won the inaugural tournament and earned $79,250.

== Winners ==
Year	Winner	Score	To par	Margin of victory	Runner(s)-up
2010	(Japan) Tetsuji Hiratsuka	274	−14	Playoff	(Thailand) Namchok Tantipokhakul
2009	(Sweden) Johan Edfors	271	−17	2 strokes	(Thailand) Prayad Marksaeng (England) Chris Rodgers
