= Dormy Open =

Golf tournament

Tournament information
- Location: Åhus, Sweden
- Established: 2021
- Course: Kristianstad Golf Club
- Par: 70
- Length: 6,718 yards (6,143 m)
- Tour: Challenge Tour
- Format: Stroke play
- Prize fund: €300,000
- Month played: August

Tournament record score
- Aggregate: 260 Anders Emil Ejlersen (2025)
- To par: −24 as above

Current champion
- (Sweden) Christofer Blomstrand

Location map
- Location in Sweden

The Dormy Open is a golf tournament on the Challenge Tour, first played in 2021.

== History ==
It was first played in 2021 on the Öster by Stenson course at Österåker Golf Club in Åkersberga, Sweden, 20km north-east of Stockholm. It was the last of two Challenge Tour events held in Sweden in May 2021.

The 2023 event was reduced to 54 holes due to rain, as well as the course being reduced from a par 70 to 67 because of flooding around the course.

No tournament was played in 2024, but the event returned again in 2025, being staged at Upsala Golf Club, before being moved to Kristianstad Golf Club in 2026.

== Winners ==
Year	Winner	Score	To par	Margin of victory	Runner(s)-up
2026	(Sweden) Christofer Blomstrand	269	−11	2 strokes	(Sweden) David Lundgren (South Africa) Wilco Nienaber
2025	(Denmark) Anders Emil Ejlersen	260	−24	1 stroke	(Iceland) Haraldur Magnús
2024: No tournament
2023	(South Africa) Jacques Kruyswijk	192 (Note: The 2023 event was shortened to 54 holes due to rain, with the course playing as a par 67.)	−9	2 strokes	(Germany) Anton Albers (Spain) Iván Cantero (France) Ugo Coussaud (Republic of Ireland) Conor Purcell
2022	(Spain) Emilio Cuartero	273	−15	1 stroke	(Switzerland) Jeremy Freiburghaus
2021	(France) Félix Mory	273	−15	Playoff (Note: Mory won with birdie on second extra hole.)	(Sweden) Björn Hellgren
