= 2011 Royal Trophy =

Golf competition

5th Edition of the Royal Trophy
- Dates: 7–9 January 2011
- Venue: Black Mountain Golf Club
- Location: Hua Hin, Thailand
- Captains: Naomichi "Joe" Ozaki (Asia); Colin Montgomerie (Europe)
Asia	7	9	Europe
- Europe wins the Royal Trophy

The 2011 Royal Trophy was the fifth edition of the Royal Trophy, a team golf event contested between teams representing Asia and Europe. It was held from 7–9 January at the Black Mountain Golf Club in Thailand. Europe won the Trophy 9 to 7.

== Teams ==
Asia		Europe	
Player	Country	Player	Country
Naomichi "Joe" Ozaki; Non-playing captain	Japan		
Yuta Ikeda	Japan	Colin Montgomerie; Playing captain	Scotland
Ryo Ishikawa	Japan	Fredrik Andersson Hed	Sweden
Kim Kyung-tae	South Korea	Rhys Davies	Wales
Liang Wenchong	China	Johan Edfors	Sweden
Noh Seung-yul	South Korea	Peter Hanson	Sweden
Jeev Milkha Singh	India	Matteo Manassero	Italy
Shunsuke Sonoda	Japan	Pablo Martín	Spain
Thongchai Jaidee	Thailand	Henrik Stenson	Sweden

== Schedule ==
- 7 January (Friday) Foursomes x 4
- 8 January (Saturday) Four-ball x 4
- 9 January (Sunday) Singles x 8

== Friday's matches (Foursomes) ==
Asia	Results	Europe
Liang/Noh	3 & 2	Stenson/Edfors
Ikeda/Kim	2 & 1	Montgomerie/Davies
Ishikawa/Sonoda	3 & 2	Manassero/Martín
Jaidee/Singh	7 & 5	Hanson/Andersson Hed
2	Session	2
2	Overall	2

== Saturday's matches (Four-ball) ==
Asia	Results	Europe
Noh/Liang	5 & 4	Montgomerie/Davies
Ishikawa/Sonoda	3 & 2	Manassero/Martín
Kim/Singh	1 up	Edfors/Stenson
Ikeda/Jaidee	3 & 1	Hanson/Andersson Hed
4	Session	0
6	Overall	2

== Sunday's matches (Singles) ==
Asia	Results	Europe
Liang	7 & 6	Hanson
Noh	halved	Stenson
Ikeda	2 & 1	Andersson Hed
Ishikawa	4 & 2	Davies
Sonoda	1 up	Manassero
Kim	3 & 1	Montgomerie
Singh	1 up	Martin
Jaidee	halved	Edfors
1	Session	7
7	Overall	9
