= Tetsuji Hiratsuka =

Japanese golfer

Tetsuji Hiratsuka 平塚 哲二
Personal information
- Nationality: Japan
- Born: 6 November 1971 (age 54) Kyoto Prefecture, Japan
- Height: 1.73 m (5 ft 8 in)
- Weight: 80 kg (176 lb; 12 st 8 lb)

Career
- Sport: Golf
- College: Nihon Taiiku University
- Turned professional: 1994
- Current tour: Japan PGA Senior Tour
- Former tours: Japan Golf Tour; Asian Tour
- Professional wins: 10
- Highest ranking: 65 (26 December 2010)

Number of wins by tour
- Japan Golf Tour: 6
- Asian Tour: 4
- Other: 1

Best results in major championships
- Masters Tournament: DNP
- PGA Championship: CUT: 2004, 2010, 2011
- U.S. Open: DNP
- The Open Championship: T36: 2004

Tetsuji Hiratsuka (平塚 哲二, Hiratsuka Tetsuji; born 6 November 1971) is a Japanese professional golfer.

== Career ==
Hiratsuka was born in Kyoto, Japan. He has won six times on the Japan Golf Tour. He represented Japan at the 2007 Omega Mission Hills World Cup with Hideto Tanihara.

== Professional wins (10) ==
=== Japan Golf Tour wins (6) ===
Legend
Japan majors (1)
Other Japan Golf Tour (5)

No.	Date	Tournament	Winning score	Margin of victory	Runner(s)-up
1	7 Dec 2003	Golf Nippon Series JT Cup	−16 (66-68-63-67=264)	3 strokes	(Japan) Toshimitsu Izawa
2	30 May 2004	Mitsubishi Diamond Cup Golf	−13 (68-70-68-69=275)	5 strokes	(Japan) Hidemasa Hoshino
3	9 Jul 2006	Woodone Open Hiroshima	−19 (68-65-64-68=265)	2 strokes	(South Korea) Hur Suk-ho, (Japan) Shingo Katayama
4	27 May 2007	Mitsubishi Diamond Cup Golf (2)	−2 (71-73-71-67=282)	1 stroke	(Japan) Satoru Hirota
5	3 May 2009	The Crowns	−17 (67-66-64-66=263)	7 strokes	(Japan) Kenichi Kuboya
6	25 Sep 2011	Asia-Pacific Panasonic Open^{1}	−8 (69-72-68-67=276)	3 strokes	(South Korea) Hur Suk-ho, (South Korea) Kim Do-hoon

^{1}Co-sanctioned by the Asian Tour

=== Asian Tour wins (4) ===
No.	Date	Tournament	Winning score	Margin of victory	Runner(s)-up
1	11 Apr 2010	Air Bagan Myanmar Open	−24 (64-65-69-66=264)	10 strokes	(Thailand) Prayad Marksaeng
2	7 Feb 2010	Queen's Cup	−11 (72-69-65-67=273)	1 stroke	(Thailand) Thaworn Wiratchant
3	19 Dec 2010	Black Mountain Masters	−14 (65-71-67-71=274)	Playoff	(Thailand) Namchok Tantipokhakul
4	25 Sep 2011	Asia-Pacific Panasonic Open^{1}	−8 (69-72-68-67=276)	3 strokes	(South Korea) Hur Suk-ho, (South Korea) Kim Do-hoon

^{1}Co-sanctioned by the Japan Golf Tour

Asian Tour playoff record (1–0)

No.	Year	Tournament	Opponent	Result
1	2010	Black Mountain Masters	(Thailand) Namchok Tantipokhakul	Won with par on first extra hole

=== Japan PGA Senior Tour wins (1) ===
No.	Date	Tournament	Winning score	Margin of victory	Runner-up
1	7 Sep 2024	Komatsu Open	−15 (66-68-67=201)	1 stroke	(Thailand) Prayad Marksaeng

== Results in major championships ==
Tournament	2004	2005	2006	2007	2008	2009	2010	2011
The Open Championship	T36							
PGA Championship	CUT						CUT	CUT

Did not play

CUT = missed the half-way cut
"T" = tied
Note: Hiratsuka never played in the Masters Tournament or the U.S. Open.

== Results in World Golf Championships ==
Tournament	2006	2007	2008	2009	2010	2011	2012
Match Play							
Championship	T50						70
Invitational							
Champions					T60	T59	

Did not play

"T" = Tied
Note that the HSBC Champions did not become a WGC event until 2009.

== Team appearances ==
- Dynasty Cup (representing Japan): 2005
- World Cup (representing Japan): 2006, 2007, 2011
- Royal Trophy (representing Asia): 2007
