= Dubliner Challenge =

Tournament information
- Location: Mölndal, Sweden
- Established: 2008
- Course: Hills Golf Club
- Par: 71
- Length: 7,169 yards (6,555 m)
- Tour: Challenge Tour
- Format: Stroke play
- Prize fund: €140,000
- Month played: September
- Final year: 2008

Tournament record score
- Aggregate: 206 Mark Haastrup (2008)
- To par: −7 as above

Final champion
- (Denmark) Mark Haastrup
- Location in Sweden

The Dubliner Challenge was a one-off golf tournament on the Challenge Tour that was played in 2008 at Hills Golf Club in Gothenburg, Sweden. It was won by Denmark's Mark Haastrup. Due to rain, the tournament was shortened to 54 holes.

== Winners ==
Year	Winner	Score	To par	Margin of victory	Runner-up
2008	(Denmark) Mark Haastrup	206 (Note: Shortened to 54 holes due to rain.)	−7	1 stroke	(Germany) Benjamin Miarka
