= Mark Haastrup =

Danish professional golfer

Personal information
- Full name: Mark Flindt Haastrup
- Nationality: Denmark
- Born: 16 April 1984 (age 42) Højby, Denmark
- Height: 1.87 m (6 ft 2 in)
- Spouse: Mandy
- Children: 2

Career
- Sport: Golf
- College: Georgia State University
- Turned professional: 2007
- Current tour: Challenge Tour
- Former tours: European Tour; Nordic Golf League
- Professional wins: 7

Number of wins by tour
- Challenge Tour: 1
- Other: 6

Best results in major championships
- Masters Tournament: DNP
- PGA Championship: DNP
- U.S. Open: DNP
- The Open Championship: CUT: 2010

Achievements and awards
- Swedish Golf Tour Order of Merit winner: 2016
- Nordic Golf League Order of Merit winner: 2016

Mark Flindt Haastrup (born 16 April 1984) is a Danish professional golfer.

== Career ==
Haastrup was born in Højby. He attended Georgia State University for two years before turning professional in 2007. He claimed his maiden professional victory on the second tier Challenge Tour the following year, and finished a consistent 2009 season by gaining his card for the top level European Tour at qualifying school.

In his first full season on the European Tour he finished at 117 on the Race to Dubai list, and got a medical exemption card for 2011 because of a broken wrist. The following years he struggled to get back on the European Tour. In 2016 he won four tournaments on the Nordic Golf League and finished first on the Order of Merit, which gave him a full card back on the Challenge Tour.

== Amateur wins ==
- 2003 Danish International Amateur Championship
- 2006 Danish National Amateur Championship

== Professional wins (7) ==
=== Challenge Tour wins (1) ===
No.	Date	Tournament	Winning score	Margin of victory	Runner-up
1	7 Sep 2008	Dubliner Challenge	−7 (70-68-68=206) (Note: Shortened to 54 holes due to weather.)	1 stroke	(Germany) Benjamin Miarka

=== Nordic Golf League wins (6) ===
No.	Date	Tournament	Winning score	Margin of victory	Runner(s)-up
1	7 Jul 2005	Centrebet Open (as an amateur)	−17 (65-67-67=199)	4 strokes	(Sweden) Markus Westerberg
2	10 Oct 2015	Tourfinal Vellinge Open	−7 (73-65-71=209)	3 strokes	(Sweden) Simon Forsström
3	2 Jul 2016	SM Match	6 and 5		(Sweden) Niclas Johansson
4	13 Aug 2016	Isaberg Open	−7 (66-70-73=209)	1 stroke	(Norway) Aksel Olsen, (Denmark) Patrick Winther
5	17 Sep 2016	Star for Life Challenge	−11 (66-69-70=205)	4 strokes	(Denmark) Daniel Løkke, (Sweden) Niclas Johansson
6	15 Oct 2016	Tourfinal Vellinge Open (2)	−6 (69-69-72=210)	Playoff	(Sweden) Niklas Lindstrom

== Results in major championships ==
Tournament	2010
The Open Championship	CUT

Note: Haastrup only played in The Open Championship.
CUT = missed the half-way cut

== Team appearances ==
Amateur

- European Boys' Team Championship (representing Denmark): 2001
- European Amateur Team Championship (representing Denmark): 2003, 2005
- European Youths' Team Championship (representing Denmark): 2004
- Eisenhower Trophy (representing Denmark): 2004, 2006
- St Andrews Trophy (representing the Continent of Europe): 2004
- Palmer Cup (representing Europe): 2006 (winners), 2007

== See also ==
- 2009 European Tour Qualifying School graduates
