= Kristian Krogh Johannessen =

Norwegian professional golfer

Personal information
- Nationality: Norway
- Born: 3 March 1995 (age 31) Drammen, Norway

Career
- Sport: Golf
- Turned professional: 2015
- Current tour: European Tour
- Former tours: Challenge Tour; Nordic Golf League
- Professional wins: 5

Number of wins by tour
- Challenge Tour: 1
- Other: 4

Kristian Krogh Johannessen (born 3 March 1995) is a Norwegian professional golfer who has played on the European Tour and the Challenge Tour. He played in the 2020 Summer Olympics and won the 2022 Italian Challenge Open.

== Amateur career ==
Johannessen played for the national team and represented Norway at the 2012 Eisenhower Trophy with Anders Engell and Kristoffer Ventura, where they finished sixth. He also played on the winning side in the 2010 Jacques Léglise Trophy, where Continental Europe won. He played in the European Boys' Team Championship three times and won silver in 2010, after he was beaten by Thomas Pieters of Belgium by 3 to 2 in the final.

He had his international breakthrough at 19 during the qualification for the 2014 Open Championship, where he lowered the course record at Bruntsfield Links near Edinburgh by four strokes, from 67 to 63 (eight under par).

In January 2015 Johannessen was slated to move to the U.S. to play college golf with the Tennessee Volunteers men's golf team at University of Tennessee, but decided to turn professional.

== Professional career ==
Johannessen joined the 2015 Nordic Golf League, where he secured his first professional victory at the 2015 Holtsmark Open on home soil, following a playoff with Petter Bocian of Sweden. He finished the season fourth in the order of merit to earn promotion to the Challenge Tour. On the Challenge Tour he was runner-up at the 2018 Swiss Challenge behind Marcel Schneider, and again at the 2020 Northern Ireland Open, two strokes behind American Tyler Koivisto. At the 2021 D+D Real Czech Challenge he lost a three-way playoff to Santiago Tarrío of Spain for his third runner-up finish.

He was one of the 27 players who earned 2019 European Tour cards through Q School in 2018. He represented Norway at the 2018 European Golf Team Championships.

In June 2021 he qualified for the 2020 Summer Olympics in Tokyo together with Viktor Hovland, just ahead of Kristoffer Ventura, thanks to the runner-up finish at the Czech Challenge which earned him 6 OWGR points and a career-high world rank of 289.

== Amateur wins ==
- 2011 Canadian International Junior Challenge
- 2012 Norgesmesterskapet Junior (Titleist Tour), Titleist Tour 7
- 2013 Team Norway Junior Tour Finale
- 2014 Titleist Tour 6

== Professional wins (5) ==
=== Challenge Tour wins (1) ===
No.	Date	Tournament	Winning score	Margin of victory	Runner-up
1	3 Jul 2022	Italian Challenge Open	−11 (66-69-71-67=273)	Playoff	(Denmark) Oliver Hundebøll

Challenge Tour playoff record (1–2)

No.	Year	Tournament	Opponent(s)	Result
1	2021	D+D Real Czech Challenge	(France) Julien Brun, (Spain) Santiago Tarrío	Tarrío won with birdie on fourth extra hole
2	2022	Italian Challenge Open	(Denmark) Oliver Hundebøll	Won with par on first extra hole
3	2026	English Open	(United States) John Catlin	Lost to birdie on seventh extra hole

=== Nordic Golf League wins (3) ===
No.	Date	Tournament	Winning score	Margin of victory	Runner(s)-up
1	14 Aug 2015	Holtsmark Open	−13 (69-64-70=203)	Playoff	(Sweden) Petter Bocian
2	28 Aug 2015	K-Supermarket Kamppi Open	−8 (69-73-66=208)	2 strokes	(Sweden) Simon Forsström, (Sweden) Mathias Johansson, (Finland) Kristian Kulokorpi (a), (Finland) Atte Rauhala, (Finland) Mikael Salminen
3	4 Mar 2018	Lumine Hills Open	−17 (65-66-68=199)	2 strokes	(Sweden) Ludwig Nordeklintll

=== Other wins (1) ===
- 2020 Norwegian National Golf Championship

== Team appearances ==
Amateur

- Jacques Léglise Trophy (representing Continental Europe): 2010 (winners)
- European Boys' Team Championship (representing Norway): 2010, 2011, 2012, 2013
- Eisenhower Trophy (representing Norway): 2012, 2014

Professional

- European Championships (representing Norway): 2018

== See also ==
- 2018 European Tour Qualifying School graduates
- 2022 Challenge Tour graduates
- 2023 European Tour Qualifying School graduates
