= Guðmundur Kristjánsson (golfer) =

Icelandic professional golfer

Personal information
- Full name: Guðmundur Ágúst Kristjánsson
- Nationality: Iceland
- Born: 7 October 1992 (age 34) Reykjavík, Iceland
- Height: 5 ft 11 in (180 cm)

Career
- Sport: Golf
- College: East Tennessee State University
- Turned professional: 2016
- Current tour: European Tour
- Former tours: Challenge Tour; Nordic Golf League
- Professional wins: 3

Guðmundur Ágúst Kristjánsson (born 7 October 1992) is an Icelandic professional golfer and European Tour player.

== Early life and amateur career ==
Kristjánsson grew up in Reykjavík, Iceland. He won the Icelandic Junior Matchplay Championship in 2005, 2007, 2008, and 2009, and in 2005, 2006, 2008 and 2010 he won the Icelandic Junior Strokeplay Championship.

He played his first event abroad in 2007 when he was 14, and three years later he won the Duke of York Young Champions Trophy at Royal St George's Golf Club in England.

Kristjánsson attended college at East Tennessee State University between 2012 and 2016, and played golf with the East Tennessee State Buccaneers men's golf team. He roomed with Adrian Meronk and won multiple times, and represented the school in the NCAA National Championship. He turned professional after graduating with a degree in physics in 2016.

== Professional career ==
Kristjánsson joined the Nordic Golf League in 2017. In 2019 he won three events and earned promotion to the Challenge Tour.

In his rookie year on the Challenge Tour, he finished fifth at the Northern Ireland Open, and became the highest ranked Icelandic golfer on the Official World Golf Ranking, as he overtook Haraldur Magnús.

In 2022, he tied for 3rd at the Vierumäki Finnish Challenge. He also came through the European Tour Qualifying School to earn a spot on the European Tour for 2023.

== Amateur wins ==
- 2005 Icelandic Junior Strokeplay Championship, Icelandic Junior Matchplay Championship
- 2006 Icelandic Junior Strokeplay Championship
- 2007 Icelandic Junior Matchplay Championship
- 2008 Icelandic Junior Strokeplay Championship, Icelandic Junior Matchplay Championship
- 2009 Icelandic Junior Matchplay Championship
- 2010 Icelandic Junior Strokeplay Championship, Duke of York Young Champions Trophy
- 2013 Icelandic Matchplay Championship
- 2015 Seminole Intercollegiate

== Professional wins (3) ==
=== Nordic Golf League wins (3) ===
No.	Date	Tournament	Winning score	Margin of victory	Runner-up
1	14 Feb 2019	Mediter Real Estate Masters	−12 (64-70-66=200)	3 strokes	(Norway) Jarand Ekeland Arnøy
2	15 Jun 2019	PGA Championship	−9 (67-67-70=204)	Shared title with (Denmark) Christian Bæch Christensen	
3	12 Jul 2019	Svea Leasing Open	−16 (66-67-67=200)	4 strokes	(Sweden) Jonathan Ågren

*Christensen and Kristjánsson agreed to share the 2019 PGA Championship (NGL) after unsafe conditions caused play to halt after three holes of a playoff.

== Team appearances ==
Amateur

- European Amateur Team Championship (representing Iceland): 2011, 2014
- Eisenhower Trophy (representing Iceland): 2010, 2016

== See also ==
- 2022 European Tour Qualifying School graduates
