= Simon Forsström =

Swedish professional golfer

Personal information
- Full name: Karl Simon Forsström
- Nationality: Sweden
- Born: 1 April 1989 (age 37) Bromma, Sweden
- Height: 1.72 m (5 ft 8 in)
- Spouse: Rut Forsström

Career
- Sport: Golf
- Turned professional: 2009
- Current tour: European Tour
- Former tours: Challenge Tour; Nordic Golf League
- Professional wins: 5

Number of wins by tour
- European Tour: 1
- Challenge Tour: 1
- Other: 3

Best results in major championships
- Masters Tournament: DNP
- PGA Championship: DNP
- U.S. Open: CUT: 2023
- The Open Championship: DNP

Karl Simon Forsström (born 1 April 1989) is a Swedish professional golfer who currently plays on the European Tour, where he has won once.

== Amateur career ==
Forsström played for AIK Golf Club. He started competing on the Swedish Teen Tour in 2004 and was runner-up at the 2008 Alex Norén Junior Open. In 2009, he won the Viksjö Junior Open and the Skandia Tour Riks #4 - Stockholm.

== Professional career ==
=== 2009–2015: Early years and Nordic Golf League success ===
Forsström turned professional in 2009. He entered the European Tour Qualifying School every year between 2008 and 2016, but spent his formative years on the satellite Nordic Golf League.

He won once and finished runner-up three times in the 2015 Nordic Golf League. His fifth-place finish on the Order of Merit earned him a Challenge Tour card for 2016.

=== 2016–2022: Challenge Tour ===
In 2016, Forsström made an eagle on the penultimate hole to card a 7-under-par 64 on the final day of the KPMG Trophy, to secure a maiden victory on the Challenge Tour, two strokes ahead of Steven Tiley.

In 2018, his best finish was tied for 3rd-place at the D+D Real Czech Challenge. In 2022, he finished runner-up at the Frederikshavn Challenge and recorded a top-five finish at the British Challenge.

=== 2023: European Tour ===
Forsström won the 2022 European Tour Qualifying School Final Stage in Tarragona, Spain, by two strokes with a score of 29-under-par over six rounds, earning him a European Tour card for the 2023 season. He recorded top-10 finishes at the Joburg Open and the AfrAsia Bank Mauritius Open, to end the 2022 calendar year 17th in the Race to Dubai standings. In May, Forsström claimed his first European Tour victory at the Soudal Open in Belgium. He shot a final-round 69 to win by one shot ahead of fellow country-man Jens Dantorp. The victory helped Forström to qualify for the 2023 U.S. Open through the European Tour "U.S. Open Qualifying Series".

== Amateur wins ==
- 2009 Viksjö Junior Open, Skandia Tour Riks #4 - Stockholm

== Professional wins (5) ==
=== European Tour wins (1) ===
No.	Date	Tournament	Winning score	Margin of victory	Runner-up
1	14 May 2023	Soudal Open	−17 (64-67-67-69=267)	1 stroke	(Sweden) Jens Dantorp

=== Challenge Tour wins (1) ===
No.	Date	Tournament	Winning score	Margin of victory	Runner-up
1	12 Jun 2016	KPMG Trophy	−20 (69-66-65-64=264)	2 strokes	(England) Steven Tiley

=== Nordic Golf League wins (2) ===
No.	Date	Tournament	Winning score	Margin of victory	Runner(s)-up
1	23 May 2015	Trummenäs Open	−10 (71-67-68=206)	1 stroke	(Norway) Kristian Krogh Johannessen
2	20 May 2022	Stora Hotellet Fjällbacka Open	−13 (69-66-65=200)	Playoff	(Sweden) Benjamin Hjort, (Denmark) Malthe Tandrup Laustsen (a)

=== Other wins (1) ===
- 2011 Högtorp Cup (Kumla Golf Club, Swedish Golf Ranking)

== Results in major championships ==
Tournament	2023
Masters Tournament	
PGA Championship	
U.S. Open	CUT
The Open Championship	

Did not play

CUT = missed the half-way cut

== See also ==
- 2022 European Tour Qualifying School graduates
