= Björn Hellgren =

Swedish professional golfer (born 1990)

Personal information
- Full name: Adam Lasse Björn Hellgren
- Nationality: Sweden
- Born: 21 November 1990 (age 35) Västerås, Sweden
- Height: 6 ft 0 in (1.83 m)
- Life partner: Lovisa Bergsjö

Career
- Sport: Golf
- College: Florida State University
- Turned professional: 2013
- Current tours: LIV Golf; Asian Tour
- Former tours: Challenge Tour; Nordic Golf League; Swedish Golf Tour
- Professional wins: 8

Number of wins by tour
- Asian Tour: 1
- Other: 7

Achievements and awards
- Skandia Tour Order of Merit winner: 2010
- Swedish Golf Tour Order of Merit winner: 2015
- PGA of Sweden Future Fund Award: 2015

Adam Lasse Björn Hellgren (born 21 November 1990) is a Swedish professional golfer who plays on the Asian Tour and LIV Golf League. He won the 2025 Saudi Open.

== Early life and amateur career ==
Hellgren was born in 1990 in Västerås. He played ice hockey on one of Sweden's premier teams until he was 15 years old, when he focused on golf.

Hellgren won the 2010 Order of Merit on the Skandia Tour, a Swedish under-21 circuit, after recording two victories, two runner-up finishes, and five other top-10s. He finished in second place after Jacob Glennemo at the Qualifying School for the 2011 Nordea Tour. He was runner-up behind Oscar Lengdén at the Swedish Junior Strokeplay Championship in 2011.

Hellgren accepted a golf scholarship to Florida State University and played golf with the Florida State Seminoles men's golf team 2011–2013 alongside Brooks Koepka and Daniel Berger.

== Professional career ==
Hellgren left college after two years and turned professional in 2013, after the European Amateur Championship in August. He joined the Nordea Tour and won the first tournament he started in as a professional, the Landeryd Masters. In April 2014, he won the Black Mountain Invitational in Thailand and joined the Nordic Golf League (NGL).

In 2015, he successfully defended his title at the Black Mountain Invitational and made his first cut on the European Tour at the 2015 Nordea Masters in Stockholm, Sweden. During the 2015 Swedish Matchplay Championship, he was hit by an errant tee-shot from Jesper Kennegård, was knocked to the ground, and required medical attention. He got up, dusted himself off, and won the match, won the tournament, and topped the 2015 Swedish Golf Tour Order of Merit.

=== Challenge Tour ===
In 2016, he won the Swedish Golf Tour's Winter Series opener, the Lumine Lakes Open in Spain. At the European Tour's Nordea Masters in June, he finished tied 4th, along with Henrik Stenson, for the biggest paycheck of his career. As a result, he played the rest of the season on the Challenge Tour, where his best finish was a solo 6th place at the Vierumäki Finnish Challenge. On the 2017 Challenge Tour, his best finish was a T10 at the Volopa Irish Challenge. In 2018, he failed to make an impact, and was back on the NGL for the 2019 season.

Hellgren was on track to shoot a 59 at the 2020 PGA Championship Bråviken Open. He was bogey-free for 17 holes in the second round, with 8 birdies and two eagles, when his birdie putt on the 18th green stopped a few inches short of the hole and his score stayed at 60, 12 under par.

In 2020, Hellgren was back on the Challenge Tour, and recorded a T5 at the Northern Ireland Open. In 2021, he narrowly missed out on his first Challenge Tour title after two opening rounds of 65, as he lost a playoff at the Dormy Open to Félix Mory of France.

=== Asian Tour ===
In January 2020, Hellgren joined the Asian Tour after finishing tied 9th at Q-School, but only competed in one event, the Bandar Malaysia Open, before play was halted due to the COVID-19 pandemic. He returned in November 2021 when the 2020–21–22 Asian Tour resumed. Hellgren played in 5 of the season's 8 tournaments, making each cut, and finished 57th on the Order of Merit.

Hellgren climbed to 41st in the Order of Merit on the 2022 Asian Tour, with a tie for 3rd at the Yeangder TPC in Taiwan his best result, and topped the driving distance stats at 313.62 yards. In 2024 he recorded four top-10 finishes, including a T7 at the International Series Thailand, and ended the season 31st in the Order of Merit. In 2025, Hellgren held the outright lead at the halfway point of the Shinhan Donghae Open at Jack Nicklaus Golf Club Korea, co-sanctioned by the Korean Tour and Japan Golf Tour, after an eight-under-par 64. He ultimately tied for 12th.

Hellgren secured his maiden Asian Tour title at the 2025 season finale, the Saudi Open. With the win, he climbed to 6th place in the final 2025 Order of Merit and received a bye into the second round of the LIV Golf promotions event in Florida, where he finished top-3 to earn a place on the 2026 LIV Golf League. In his first 10 starts on LIV, where his best finish was a tied 17th at LIV Golf UK, he collected more winnings than in his previous 10 seasons on the Challenge Tour and Asian Tour combined.

On the 2026 Asian Tour, he finished top-10 at the Singapore Open.

== Amateur wins ==
- 2008 Sura Open
- 2009 Skandia Tour Elit #5
- 2010 Skandia Tour Elit #5, Skandia Tour Elit #6

== Professional wins (8) ==
=== Asian Tour wins (1) ===
No.	Date	Tournament	Winning score	Margin of victory	Runner-up
1	13 Dec 2025	Saudi Open	−23 (66-65-67-67=265)	1 stroke	(Australia) Jack Thompson

=== Nordic Golf League wins (4) ===
No.	Date	Tournament	Winning score	Margin of victory	Runner-up
1	25 Aug 2013	Landeryd Masters	−15 (67-69-65=201)	1 stroke	(Sweden) Steven Jeppesen
2	28 Jun 2015	SM Match	3 and 2		(Sweden) Anton Wejshag
3	28 Feb 2016	Lumine Lakes Open	−14 (69-69-64=202)	Playoff	(Sweden) Oscar Lengdén
4	7 Jul 2023	Arlandastad Trophy	−10 (68-68-64=200)	1 stroke	(Denmark) Jonas Lykke Petersen

=== Swedish Golf Tour wins (3) ===
No.	Date	Tournament	Winning score	Margin of victory	Runner(s)-up
1	5 Apr 2014	Black Mountain Invitational	−13 (67-67-69=203)	4 strokes	(Sweden) Sebastian Söderberg
2	20 Apr 2015	Black Mountain Invitational (2)	−6 (67-74-69=210)	1 stroke	(Sweden) Daniel Jennevret, (Sweden) David Palm
3	1 Aug 2020	PGA Championship Bråviken Open	−21 (68-60-67=195)	Playoff	(Sweden) Mikael Lindberg

== Playoff record ==
Challenge Tour playoff record (0–1)

No.	Year	Tournament	Opponent	Result
1	2021	Dormy Open	(France) Félix Mory	Lost to birdie on second extra hole
