= Oscar Lengdén =

Swedish professional golfer

Personal information
- Full name: Erik Oscar Lengdén
- Nationality: Sweden
- Born: 12 May 1992 (age 34)
- Height: 1.78 m (5 ft 10 in)

Career
- Sport: Golf
- College: Nova Southeastern University
- Turned professional: 2015
- Current tours: Challenge Tour; European Tour
- Former tour: Nordic Golf League
- Professional wins: 4

Number of wins by tour
- Challenge Tour: 2
- Other: 2

Oscar Lengdén (born 12 May 1992) is a Swedish professional golfer.

Lengdén spent four years and won two NCAA Division titles at Nova Southeastern University in Fort Lauderdale before he returned to Europe and turned professional in 2015. Competing in his native Sweden he won four times in six weeks to earn his place on the Nordic Golf League, where he won twice. He finished third on the 2016 Nordic Golf League ranking to become a Challenge Tour rookie in 2017.

Lengdén made it to the final qualifying stage at the European Tour Qualifying School in 2016 but failed by one stroke to earn a European Tour card. He made a handful of starts on the 2017 European Tour and finished tied for fifth at the D+D Real Czech Masters. The following week he claimed his maiden Challenge Tour victory at the Bridgestone Challenge in September. The event used a modified Stableford scoring system. Lengdén finished birdie-birdie-eagle to gain 9 points on the final three holes and won the tournament by 2 points. His run of form continued when, the next week, he was joint runner-up in the Irish Challenge, after which he rose to 186 on the Official World Golf Ranking.

== Professional wins (4) ==
=== Challenge Tour wins (2) ===
No.	Date	Tournament	Winning score	Margin of victory	Runner(s)-up
1	10 Sep 2017	Bridgestone Challenge	49 pts (12-4-14-19=49)	2 points	(Germany) Nicolai von Dellingshausen
2	6 May 2018	Challenge de España	−15 (69-69-68-67=273)	4 strokes	(Netherlands) Wil Besseling, (England) Ross McGowan

Challenge Tour playoff record (0–1)

No.	Year	Tournament	Opponent	Result
1	2019	Stone Irish Challenge	(Spain) Emilio Cuartero	Lost to birdie on third extra hole

=== Nordic Golf League wins (2) ===
No.	Date	Tournament	Winning score	Margin of victory	Runner-up
1	20 Aug 2016	Norwegian Open	−12 (68-69-67=204)	6 strokes	(Sweden) Gustaf Kocken
2	4 Mar 2017	Lumine Hills Open	−11 (64-67-73=204)	3 strokes	(Denmark) Victor Østerby

== Team appearances ==
Amateur

- European Boys' Team Championship (representing Sweden): 2010
