= Johan Edfors =

Swedish professional golfer

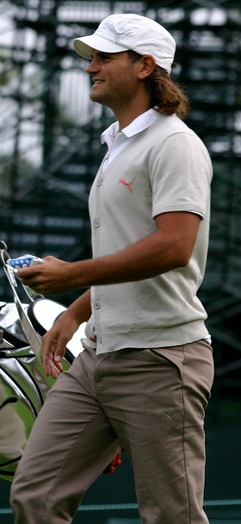

Personal information
- Nationality: Sweden
- Born: 10 October 1975 (age 51) Varberg, Sweden
- Height: 1.84 m (6 ft 0 in)
- Weight: 84 kg (185 lb; 13.2 st)

Career
- Sport: Golf
- College: University of Texas at San Antonio
- Turned professional: 1997
- Current tour: European Senior Tour
- Former tours: European Tour; Sunshine Tour; Challenge Tour; Nordic Golf League
- Professional wins: 12
- Highest ranking: 44 (7 January 2007)

Number of wins by tour
- European Tour: 3
- Asian Tour: 2
- Sunshine Tour: 1
- Challenge Tour: 4
- European Senior Tour: 2
- Other: 2

Best results in major championships
- Masters Tournament: CUT: 2007
- PGA Championship: T39: 2011
- U.S. Open: T19: 2011
- The Open Championship: T52: 2009

Achievements and awards
- Challenge Tour Rankings winner: 2003
- Sunshine Tour Rookie of the Year: 2003–04

Johan Edfors (born 10 October 1975) is a Swedish professional golfer who played on the European Tour and now plays on the European Senior Tour.

== Early life and amateur career ==
Edfors was born in Varberg. He attended the University of Texas at San Antonio on a Division I athletic scholarship for men's golf. He played for the team under the coaching of Barry Denton for two years.

== Professional career ==
Edfors turned professional in 1997. He spent several years playing the second tier Challenge Tour, but failed to make the top hundred on the Order of Merit until 2003, when he won twice and topped the Challenge Tour Order of Merit. He narrowly failed to hold on to his tour card in 2004, but at the end of 2005 he regained it at the Final Qualifying School.

In 2006, Edfors achieved a maiden European Tour win at the TCL Classic and quickly followed up by winning the more prestigious Quinn Direct British Masters and the Scottish Open. His three victories took him into the top 50 of the Official World Golf Rankings in July 2006, and he finished the year placed 10th on the European Order of Merit.

Edfors had to wait almost three years for his next victory, which he achieved at the inaugural Black Mountain Masters in Thailand on the Asian Tour.

Edfors is known for being a big hitter averaging over 300 yards.

Edfors made his European Senior Tour debut at the 2025 Senior Italian Open, where he tied for 2nd.

== Awards, honors ==
In 2006, he received Elit Sign number 133 by the Swedish Golf Federation based on world ranking achievements.

In 2012, he was awarded honorary member of the PGA of Sweden.

== Professional wins (12) ==
=== European Tour wins (3) ===
No.	Date	Tournament	Winning score	Margin of victory	Runner(s)-up
1	19 Mar 2006	TCL Classic^{1}	−25 (66-66-63-68=263)	1 stroke	(Australia) Andrew Buckle
2	14 May 2006	Quinn Direct British Masters	−11 (68-69-70-70=277)	1 stroke	(England) Gary Emerson, (Scotland) Stephen Gallacher, (Sweden) Jarmo Sandelin
3	16 Jul 2006	Barclays Scottish Open	−13 (65-69-74-63=271)	2 strokes	(England) Luke Donald, (Argentina) Andrés Romero, (South Africa) Charl Schwartzel

^{1}Co-sanctioned by the Asian Tour

=== Asian Tour wins (2) ===
No.	Date	Tournament	Winning score	Margin of victory	Runner(s)-up
1	19 Mar 2006	TCL Classic^{1}	−25 (66-66-63-68=263)	1 stroke	(Australia) Andrew Buckle
2	29 Mar 2009	Black Mountain Masters	−17 (64-68-71-68=271)	2 strokes	(Thailand) Prayad Marksaeng, (England) Chris Rodgers

^{1}Co-sanctioned by the European Tour

=== Sunshine Tour wins (1) ===
No.	Date	Tournament	Winning score	Margin of victory	Runner-up
1	9 Mar 2003	Stanbic Zambia Open^{1}	−13 (70-70-66=206) (Note: Shortened to 54 holes due to weather.)	4 strokes	(South Africa) Michael Kirk

^{1}Co-sanctioned by the Challenge Tour

=== Challenge Tour wins (4) ===
No.	Date	Tournament	Winning score	Margin of victory	Runner(s)-up
1	9 Mar 2003	Stanbic Zambia Open^{1}	−13 (70-70-66=206)	4 strokes	(South Africa) Michael Kirk
2	25 May 2003	Fortis Challenge Open	−15 (67-67-69-70=273)	2 strokes	(Sweden) Kalle Brink
3	19 Oct 2014	Shankai Classic	−15 (69-66-66=201)	3 strokes	(France) Mike Lorenzo-Vera
4	9 Oct 2016	Terre dei Consoli Open	−13 (70-70-66-69=275)	3 strokes	(Sweden) Alexander Björk, (Spain) Jordi García Pinto

^{1}Co-sanctioned by the Sunshine Tour

Challenge Tour playoff record (0–1)

No.	Year	Tournament	Opponent	Result
1	2003	Challenge Tour Grand Final	(Spain) José Manuel Carriles	Lost to birdie on first extra hole

=== Nordic Golf League wins (1) ===
No.	Date	Tournament	Winning score	Margin of victory	Runner-up
1	15 May 2002	Telia Grand Opening	−5 (65-70=135)	4 strokes	(Sweden) Hampus von Post

=== Swedish Golf Tour wins (1) ===
No.	Date	Tournament	Winning score	Margin of victory	Runner-up
1	6 Apr 2013	Black Mountain Invitational	−10 (67-70-69=206)	2 strokes	(Sweden) Jacob Glennemo

=== European Senior Tour wins (2) ===
No.	Date	Tournament	Winning score	Margin of victory	Runner(s)-up
1	12 Jul 2026	OFX Irish Legends	−17 (67-66-66=199)	3 strokes	(England) Robert Coles
2	20 Sep 2026	European Legends Cup	−15 (72-65-64=201)	3 strokes	(England) Robert Coles, (England) Steve Webster

== Results in major championships ==
Tournament	2006	2007	2008	2009	2010	2011
Masters Tournament		CUT				
U.S. Open		CUT	CUT	T27		T19
The Open Championship	CUT	CUT	CUT	T52		
PGA Championship	CUT	CUT		CUT		T39

Did not play

CUT = missed the half-way cut
"T" = tied

== Results in World Golf Championships ==
Tournament	2006	2007
Match Play		R64
Championship	T22	T45
Invitational	T62	

Did not play

QF, R16, R32, R64 = Round in which player lost in match play
"T" = Tied

== Team appearances ==
Amateur

- Jacques Léglise Trophy (representing the Continent of Europe): 1993

Professional

- Royal Trophy (representing Europe): 2007 (winners), 2009, 2011 (winners)
- European Championships (representing Sweden): 2018

== See also ==
- 2005 European Tour Qualifying School graduates
