= Willie Milne =

Scottish golfer (1951–2023)

Personal information
- Full name: William Torbet Gray Milne
- Nationality: Scotland
- Born: 13 July 1951 Scotland
- Died: 31 January 2023 (aged 71) Thailand
- Height: 6 ft 4 in (193 cm)

Career
- Sport: Golf
- Turned professional: 1973

Best results in major championships
- Masters Tournament: DNP
- PGA Championship: DNP
- U.S. Open: DNP
- The Open Championship: CUT: 1973, 1974, 1976, 1977, 1979

William Torbet Gray Milne (13 July 1951 – 31 January 2023) was a Scottish professional golfer. As an amateur, he played in the 1973 Walker Cup. He turned professional soon afterwards and had immediate success, winning the Lusaka Open and the Northern Open before the middle of 1974, as well as a large prize for making a hole-in-one in the Cock o' the North tournament. He played on the European Tour from 1974 to 1980 but struggled for success, his best result being runner-up in the 1979 French Open. From 1981 he became a club professional, playing twice in the PGA Cup.

== Amateur career ==
In 1972 Milne played for the Great Britain & Ireland youth team (under-21) against Continental Europe at Glasgow Gailes GC. He also made his debut for the Scottish senior team in the Men's Home Internationals.

In 1973 he played for Scotland in the European Amateur Team Championship in Portugal. Scotland led after the qualifying round, helped by Milne's 71 which was only matched by two other players. Scotland reached the final but lost narrowly to England. Milne played in all six matches, winning five and only losing against England in the foursomes. His performances saw him selected for the Walker Cup in Brookline, Massachusetts, which was announced a few days later. The contest was played in late August, the United States winning 14 matches to 10. Milne lost both his foursomes but won both single matches, beating Mark Pfeil and Mike Killian. In September Milne played in the Men's Home Internationals, Scotland finishing runners-up to England.

== Professional career ==
Milne turned professional in late 1973. From 1973 to 1980 he was a tournament professional playing on the European Tour and in Scottish domestic tournaments. He had early success in the Lusaka Open, a Safari Circuit event in Zambia in March 1974. Milne led after three rounds and then became the winner after the last round was abandoned because of bad weather. He won by a stroke from Guy Hunt and David Jagger. The following week he made a hole-in-one during the Cock o' the North tournament in Zambia, winning £3,450. He won the Northern Open in May 1974, retained it in 1975 and was runner-up in 1979. His best result in a European Tour event was in May 1979 when he was runner-up to Bernard Gallacher in the French Open. In 1980 he was runner-up in the Scottish Professional Championship, four strokes behind Sam Torrance.

Milne first played in the Open Championship in 1973 as an amateur and then a further four times between 1974 and 1979, missing the cut on each occasion. He gained some attention at the 1999 Open Championship at Carnoustie when at the age of 48 and acting as marker for Martyn Thompson in the third round, he went round in 76, better than many of the players competing in the event.

From 1981 Milne became a club professional. He competed in the PGA Club Professionals' Championship, finishing 9th in 1982 and 5th in 1986, giving him a place in the PGA Cup team in those two years. He was runner-up in the 1985 Watsons of Airdrie Monklands Masters at Drumpellier, six strokes behind David Huish. Milne played a few events on the European Senior Tour from 2001 to 2006 but had little success. From 2004 he was at the Olching Golf Club near Munich before moving into the golf travel business.

Milne was at times a controversial character. In May 1975 he was fined £500 for signing an incorrect card at the Nigerian Open and failing to report it when he realised the mistake. In January 2001 he was sacked from his position at the Carnoustie Golf Course Hotel & Resort following his drunken behaviour at a Christmas party. He later won an industrial tribunal relating to his dismissal.

== Personal life ==
Milne died in Thailand on 31 January 2023 at the age of 71.

== Results in major championships ==
Tournament	1973	1974	1975	1976	1977	1978	1979
The Open Championship	CUT	CUT		CUT	CUT		CUT

Note: Milne only played in The Open Championship.

Did not play

CUT = missed the half-way cut (3rd round cut in 1974 Open Championship)

== Team appearances ==
Amateur

- Walker Cup (representing Great Britain & Ireland): 1973
- EGA Trophy (representing Great Britain & Ireland): 1972 (winners)
- Men's Home Internationals (representing Scotland): 1972 (joint winners), 1973
- European Amateur Team Championship (representing Scotland): 1973

Professional

- PGA Cup (representing Great Britain and Ireland): 1982, 1986
