= Craig Maltman =

Scottish golfer (born 1953)

Personal information
- Full name: Thomas Craig Maltman
- Nationality: Scotland
- Born: 23 March 1953 (age 73) Eyemouth, Scotland

Career
- Sport: Golf
- Turned professional: 1972
- Former tours: European Tour; European Senior Tour; Challenge Tour
- Professional wins: 7

Number of wins by tour
- Challenge Tour: 1
- Other: 6

Thomas Craig Maltman (born 23 March 1953) is a Scottish professional golfer. He had some successes in Scottish events, winning the Scottish Assistants' Championship three times and winning the Tartan Tour Order of Merit in 1989 after winning the Sunderland Sportswear Masters and the Ram Classic that year. He played on the Safari Circuit, winning 1989 Zambia Open and the 1993 Kenya Open.

== Professional career ==
Maltman had been an assistant greenkeeper at Dunbar before turning professional. He was an assistant as Knebworth and then at Beadlow Manor. He won the Scottish Assistants' Championship three times, in 1972, 1975 and 1976, and was also runner-up, behind Jim Noon, in 1974.

Maltman became the professional at Eyemouth in the late 1970s. He played a number of European Tour events in the early 1980s, with little success. He was tied for third place after three rounds of the 1981 Coral Classic at Royal Porthcawl after a third-round 66, but a final round 77 dropped him into a tie for 10th place.

Domestically Maltman's best season was 1989 when he won the Scottish region Order of Merit. He had two wins during the season, in the Sunderland Sportswear Masters and the Ram Classic. He was runner-up in a number of Scottish 72-hole events, including the 1983 Carnoustie Challenge, the 1987 Sunderland Sportswear Masters, the Daily Express Scottish National Pro-am in 1989, 1990 and 1991, and the Gore-Tex Fabrics Challenge in 1992. Maltman gained a place on the 1990 European Tour by finishing 42nd in the qualifying school at La Manga in December 1989. He had some success, making the cut in his first seven tournaments between February and May. but had some poor results and dropped off the tour at the end of July.

Maltman finished third in the 1992 Glenmuir Club Professional Championship to gain a place in the PGA Cup team that year. He also made the team in 1994. He only won one of his five matches in 1992 but had better results in 1994, winning three matches out of four.

Maltman was a regular competitor on the Safari Circuit. In 1984 he was a runner-up in the Ivory Coast Open, five strokes behind Bill McColl. He won the Zambia Open in 1989 and was a runner-up the following year. He was runner-up in the 1992 Kenya Open, a stroke behind André Bossert, and won the event the following year, making a birdie at the third playoff hole against Peter Harrison and Daniel Westermark.

Maltman competed on the European Senior Tour from 2003 to 2006. He had four top-10 finishes including three in successive events from April to June 2005.

== Professional wins (7) ==
=== Challenge Tour wins (1) ===
No.	Date	Tournament	Winning score	Margin of victory	Runners-up
1	7 Feb 1993	Kenya Open	−8 (74-66-69-67=276)	Playoff	(England) Peter Harrison, (Sweden) Daniel Westermark

Challenge Tour playoff record (1–0)

No.	Year	Tournament	Opponents	Result
1	1993	Kenya Open	(England) Peter Harrison, (Sweden) Daniel Westermark	Won with birdie on third extra hole

=== Safari Circuit wins (1) ===
No.	Date	Tournament	Winning score	Margin of victory	Runner-up
1	5 Feb 1989	Zambia Open	E (67-76-62=215)	2 strokes	(England) Mark Roe

=== Other wins (5) ===
- 1972 Scottish Assistants' Championship
- 1975 Scottish Assistants' Championship
- 1976 Scottish Assistants' Championship
- 1989 Sunderland Sportswear Masters, Ram Classic

== Team appearances ==
- PGA Cup (representing Great Britain and Ireland): 1992, 1994
