= Russell Weir =

Scottish golfer (1951–2022)

Personal information
- Full name: Russell David Weir
- Nationality: Scotland
- Born: 11 July 1951 Dunoon, Scotland
- Died: 21 September 2022 (aged 71) Greenock, Scotland

Career
- Sport: Golf
- Turned professional: 1971
- Former tour: European Senior Tour
- Professional wins: 17

Number of wins by tour
- European Senior Tour: 1
- Other: 16

Best results in major championships
- Masters Tournament: DNP
- PGA Championship: DNP
- U.S. Open: DNP
- The Open Championship: CUT

Russell David Weir (11 July 1951 – 21 September 2022) was a Scottish professional golfer. He chose not to play on the main tours, remaining a club professional. He played mostly on the Scottish PGA circuit, the "Tartan Tour", where he won over 100 times. He won the PGA Club Professionals Championship in 1987 and 1988 and won the European club professional title three times. He played in eight consecutive PGA Cup matches between 1986 and 2000 and was captain of the Great Britain and Ireland team in 2011 and 2013. After reaching 50 he played on the European Senior Tour where he won once.

== Amateur career ==
Weir won the Scottish Boys' Championship at North Berwick in April 1968, beating Mike Grubb 6&4 in the 36-hole final. He had reduced his handicap from 12 to 4 in the previous year. In August he captained the Scottish team in the England–Scotland boys match that preceded the Boys Amateur Championship. In 1969 he finished fifth in the British Youths Open Amateur Championship at Lindrick, despite a poor finish. He represented Scotland in the 1971 youth international against England, that preceded the British youths championship.

== Professional career ==
Weir turned professional in 1971 and became the professional at Cowal Golf Club, Dunoon, in 1979. Despite qualifying for the Open Championship in 1975 and 1976, he had little success until the early 1980s. He never played regularly on any of the major tours, but had considerable success on the domestic "Tartan Tour" where he won over 100 times. His first 72-hole win came in the 1983 Scottish Coca-Cola Tournament at North Berwick, where he finished with two rounds of 68 to beat David Robertson by a stroke. In 1984 he won the Carnoustie Challenge with a score of 11-under-par on the championship course, a stroke ahead of Bill Lockie, while in 1985 he won the Scottish Brewers Round-robin Tournament at Dumphries & County, with seven wins and a half from his eight matches. In 1986 he won the Northern Open at Nairn, a stroke ahead of Ross Drummond, despite Drummond's final round of 67. He also won the Dunbar Professional Championship three times in succession from 1988 to 1990, the Sunderland of Scotland Masters three times, in 1988, 1990 and 1994, and the 1989 Daily Express Scottish National Pro-am. He never won the Scottish PGA Championship, although he was twice a runner-up, behind Drummond in 1987 and Sam Torrance in 1991. Weir won the Scottish region Order of Merit five times, in 1983, 1986, 1988, 1990 and 1993.

Weir was twice winner of the PGA Club Professionals' Championship, in 1987 and 1988. At Sandiway in 1987 he won by two strokes from John Hoskison and David Huish, despite taking seven at the par-3 13th in the final round. In 1988 at Royal St David's he won by eight strokes from Ged Furey. In the 1987 Scottish Open Weir had a final round 66 to finish tied for 15th place. He gained an entry into the Open Championship at Muirfield the following week, as one of the leading five not already qualified. The following year, 1988, he did even better, finishing tied for 8th place and again earning a place in the Open. This 8th place finish was his best finish in an official European Tour event, although he finished third in the 1989 Motorola Classic at Burnham & Berrow, an event the tour jointly organised with the PGA.

Weir won the European teaching professionals title at Broekpolder three times.

Weir competed in the PGA Cup eight consecutive times between 1986 and 2000 and was captain of the Great Britain and Ireland team in 2011 and 2013.

Weir played on the European Senior Tour from 2001 to 2003 and in 2005. In 2001 he won the TEMES Seniors Open in Greece, a stroke ahead of David Good.

== Personal life ==
Weir died on 21 September 2022, at the age of 71.

== Amateur wins ==
- 1968 Scottish Boys' Championship

== Professional wins (17) ==
=== Other wins (16) ===
- 1983 Scottish Coca-Cola Tournament
- 1984 Carnoustie Challenge
- 1985 Scottish Brewers Round-robin Tournament
- 1986 Northern Open
- 1987 Wilson Club Professionals' Championship
- 1988 Wilson Club Professionals' Championship, European Teaching Professionals Championship, Dunbar Professional Championship, Sunderland of Scotland Masters
- 1989 European Teaching Professionals Championship, Dunbar Professional Championship, Daily Express Scottish National Pro-am
- 1990 Dunbar Professional Championship, Sunderland of Scotland Masters
- 1993 European Teaching Professionals Championship
- 1994 Sunderland of Scotland Masters

=== European Seniors Tour wins (1) ===
No.	Date	Tournament	Winning score	Margin of victory	Runner-up
1	23 Sep 2001	TEMES Seniors Open	−14 (66-68-68=202)	1 stroke	(Australia) David Good

== Results in major championships ==
Tournament	1975	1976	1977	1978	1979	1980	1981	1982	1983	1984	1985	1986	1987	1988	1989	1990	1991	1992	1993	1994	1995
The Open Championship	CUT	CUT											CUT	CUT		CUT					CUT

Note: Weir only played in The Open Championship.

Did not play

CUT = missed the half-way cut

== Team appearances ==
Amateur

- England–Scotland boys match (representing Scotland): 1968
- England–Scotland youths match (representing Scotland): 1971

Professional

- PGA Cup (representing Great Britain and Ireland): 1986, 1988, 1990, 1992, 1994, 1996 (tied), 1998, 2000, 2011 (non-playing captain), 2013 (tied, non-playing captain)
