= Peter Tupling =

English professional golfer

Personal information
- Full name: Leonard Peter Tupling
- Nationality: England
- Born: 6 April 1950 (age 76) Sheffield, England

Career
- Sport: Golf
- Turned professional: 1969
- Former tour: European Tour
- Professional wins: 1

Best results in major championships
- Masters Tournament: DNP
- PGA Championship: DNP
- U.S. Open: DNP
- The Open Championship: T28: 1969

Leonard Peter Tupling (born 6 April 1950) is an English professional golfer. As an amateur he won the Boys Amateur Championship in 1967. In 1969, he was the leading amateur in the Open Championship and played in the Walker Cup. As a professional, he is best remembered for winning the 1981 Nigerian Open with a 72-hole score of 255, at the time a new world scoring record in professional golf.

== Amateur career ==
Tupling had a successful amateur career, playing out from Phoenix Golf Club in Rotherham, South Yorkshire, England. He represented a combined England and Scotland boys team in the 1966 International against the Continent of Europe, and represented England in the annual England–Scotland boys match in 1966 and 1967. In 1967 he went on to win the Boys Amateur Championship, beating Stephen Evans 4&2 at Western Gailes. Tupling was four down after six holes but recovered to be 2 up after the opening round.

In early 1968, Tupling was a joint-runner up, behind Peter Dawson, in the Carris Trophy. In June, he became the youngest winner of the Yorkshire Amateur, beating Richard Hutton, 7 and 6, in the 36-hole final at Lindrick. In May 1969, he was runner-up in the Lytham Trophy two strokes behind Tom Craddock. He had two rounds of 72 on the final day, the best aggregate for the day. Two weeks later, he led the Brabazon Trophy at Moortown after two rounds, but two rounds of 78 on the final day dropped him down the field, six strokes behind the joint winners.

He was selected for the England team in the 1969 European Amateur Team Championship at the end of June, England winning the event. In July, he won the silver medal at the Open Championship as the leading amateur and gained selection for the Walker Cup team. The Walker Cup was played at Milwaukee Country Club in late August. Tupling lost to Dick Siderowf in a first day singles match, but won a foursomes match on the final day, playing with Michael Bonallack.

== Professional career ==
Tupling turned professional in late 1969. He finished tied for fourth place in the 1970 Daks Tournament, behind Neil Coles. He was runner-up in the under-23 BUA Rising Star Tournament, a stroke behind Nick Job. In 1971, he was a runner-up in the W.D. & H.O. Wills Tournament at Dalmahoy, behind Bernard Hunt and tied with Bob Charles.

Tupling played on the European Tour from its start in 1972 until 1985. He never won on the tour, his best finish being runner-up, a stroke behind Tommy Horton, in the Penfold Tournament at Hill Barn in 1974. 1974 was to be his best season on the tour, which included a quarter-final finish in the Piccadilly Medal, a tie for 6th place in the Italian Open and four other top-20 finishes. In 1975 he was third in the Kerrygold International Classic.

Tupling led the 1972 Open Championship after a first round 68, a stroke ahead of Tony Jacklin. However rounds of 74, 73 and 81 left him tied for 46th place, despite still tied 8th after three rounds. He played in the Open Championship ten times, however his best finish remained his first appearance as an amateur when he finished tied for 28th place.

Tupling was a regular competitor on the Safari Circuit. He was runner-up to David Llewellyn in the 1972 Kenya Open. In 1973 he was a runner-up in two events in Zambia, the Cock o' the North, where he finished behind Mike Ingham, and in the Zambia Open, behind Craig Defoy. In 1982 Tupling was runner-up to David Jagger in the Kalahari Diamond Classic.

=== Record score ===
In 1981, he won the Nigerian Open, at the Ikoyi Club in Lagos, with a 72-hole score of 255 after rounds of 63-66-62-64, six strokes ahead of Bill Longmuir. At the time, it was a new world record score over 72 holes in professional golf, beating the previous record of 257 by Mike Souchak reached at the 1955 Texas Open. The Nigerian Open was played on a course with putting surfaces build by oil soaked sand, considered making the short game easier. The record was beaten by one shot by Tommy Armour III at the 2003 Texas Open on the PGA Tour. Justin Thomas lowered the mark to 253 in 2017 at the Sony Open in Hawaii.

=== Retirement ===
After his retirement from tournament golf in 1986, Tupling served as Director of Golf at Sandy Lane, Barbados, for two years. From 2004, he worked as senior teaching professional at Cookridge Hall Golf Club in Leeds, England.

== Amateur wins ==
- 1967 Boys Amateur Championship
- 1968 Yorkshire Amateur

== Professional wins (1) ==
=== Safari Circuit wins (1) ===
No.	Date	Tournament	Winning score	Margin of victory	Runner-up
1	22 Feb 1981	Nigerian Open	−29 (63-66-62-64=255)	6 strokes	(Scotland) Bill Longmuir

== Results in major championships ==
Tournament	1969	1970	1971	1972	1973	1974	1975	1976	1977	1978	1979	1980	1981	1982
The Open Championship	T28LA		CUT	T46			CUT	T63	CUT	CUT	CUT	63		CUT

Note: Tupling only played in The Open Championship.

Did not play

LA = Low amateur
CUT = missed the half-way cut (3rd round cut in 1982 Open Championship)
"T" indicates a tie for a place

== Team appearances ==
Amateur

- Boys' match v Continent of Europe (representing combined England & Scotland): 1966 (winners)
- England–Scotland boys match (representing England): 1966 (winners), 1967
- EGA Trophy (representing Great Britain & Ireland): 1968 (winners)
- European Amateur Team Championship (representing England): 1969 (winners)
- Men's Home Internationals (representing England): 1969
- Walker Cup (representing Great Britain & Ireland): 1969

Professional

- PGA Cup (representing Great Britain and Ireland): 1978 (winners)
