= Jack Wilkshire =

English golfer (1931–2022)

Personal information
- Full name: John W. Wilkshire
- Nationality: England
- Born: 20 July 1931 Liverpool, England
- Died: 2022 (aged 91)

Career
- Sport: Golf
- Turned professional: 1949
- Former tour: European Senior Tour

Best results in major championships
- Masters Tournament: DNP
- PGA Championship: DNP
- U.S. Open: DNP
- The Open Championship: 33rd: 1958

John W. Wilkshire (20 July 1931 – 2022) was an English professional golfer. He won the Northern Professional Championship in 1961 and 1965 and was runner-up in the 1969 Portuguese Open. He played in the Open Championship 11 times, making the cut four times.

== Golf career ==
Wilkshire never won a major tournament, although he was runner-up in the 1969 Portuguese Open behind Ramón Sota. He won the Northern Professional Championship in 1961 and 1965 and was a runner-up in 1955 and 1957. He was runner-up in the 1965 Leeds Cup. He also won the Nottinghamshire Professional Strokeplay Championship in 1978 and the Nottinghamshire Professional Matchplay Championship in 1978 and 1979.

Wilkshire played in the Open Championship 11 times between 1955 and 1971, making the cut four times, with a best finish of 33rd in 1958. He was tied for second place after an opening round of 69 in the 1967 Open Championship. However he had a second round of 78 and eventually finished in a tie for 47th place.

Wilkshire finished fifth in the inaugural PGA Professional Championship at Calcot Park in August 1973. This gave him a place in the British and Irish team for the Diamondhead Cup match at Pinehurst, North Carolina, later in the year. The match was the forerunner of the PGA Cup.

Despite being over 60 when the tour started in 1992, Wilkshire played on the European Senior Tour from 1992 to 1996.

Wilkshire turned professional in 1949. He was an assistant at West Derby and Carlisle City and later was the professional at a number of clubs, including Crompton & Royton, St Anne’s Old Links, Sherwood Forest, Arrowe Park, Stone Golf Club, Warren Heath and Bicester Golf Club.

== Personal life ==
Wilkshire died in late 2022 at the age of 91.

Jack Wilkshire was the oldest of five children. With 3 younger sisters and one younger brother.

== Results in major championships ==
Tournament	1955	1956	1957	1958	1959	1960	1961	1962	1963	1964	1965	1966	1967	1968	1969	1970	1971
The Open Championship	CUT	47	CUT	33	CUT		CUT		CUT			CUT	T47		CUT		T49

Note: Wilkshire only played in The Open Championship.

Did not play

CUT = missed the half-way cut
"T" indicates a tie for a place

== Team appearances ==
- Diamondhead Cup (representing Great Britain and Ireland): 1973
