= PGA Cup =

Team golf tournament

Tournament information
- Location: 2026: Ireland
- Established: 1973
- Course: 2026: K Club
- Format: Match play
- Month played: September

Current champion
- Great Britain & Ireland (2026)

The PGA Cup is a men's golf competition for club professionals played between a Great Britain and Ireland team and a United States team. The winning team is presented with the Llandudno Trophy. The competition is run by the British PGA and the PGA of America. It was first played in 1973 and was an annual event until 1984, after which it became biennial.

== History ==
The first two contests, at Pinehurst Resort in North Carolina, in 1973 and 1974, were contested for the Diamondhead Cup. Diamondhead Corp. was the owner of Pinehurst and sponsored the event. From 1975, the event was organised by the two PGAs and became known as the PGA Cup.

In 1990 the event was opened up to the golfers from continental Europe but from 1996 the British PGA team was again restricted to players from Great Britain and Ireland.

The 2017 PGA Cup was held on the Longcross course at Foxhills Golf Club, Ottershaw, Surrey, from 15 to 17 September and was won by Great Britain and Ireland by a score of 16 to 10, their second successive victory.

The 2019 PGA Cup was held on the Fazio Foothills course at Omni Barton Creek Resort & Spa, Austin, Texas, from 27 to 29 September and was won by the United States by a score of 14 to 12, their first outright victory since 2011.

The 2022 event, the 30th contest, was held at the Foxhills Golf Club in Surrey, England, the second time that the course had been chosen to host the event. The United States won by five points, to retain the trophy they won in 2019.

== Trophy ==
The trophy was first used for the Llandudno International Golf Trophy contested by the leading professionals from England, Scotland, Ireland and Wales. The first tournament was held in September 1938 and Llandudno council presented a silver trophy to the P.G.A. for the winning team. Percy Alliss, the captain of the winning English team, took possession of the trophy. It was intended that the tournament would be the first of a series of matches but the Second World War interrupted these plans and the contests were not restarted after the war. During Alliss's later years, the trophy was returned to the P.G.A. and was then used as the trophy for the PGA Cup.

== Format ==
The event is contested by teams of ten players over three days, with four foursomes and four fourball matches on each of the first two days, and ten singles matches on the final day. All matches are over 18 holes.

The format of the PGA Cup has changed over the years. In 1973 and 1974 it was a two-day competition but in 1975 the event was expanded to three days. In the initial format only 8 of the 9 players contested the singles but from 1977 the whole team play in this session. From 1980 both foursomes and fourballs have been played on the first two days. The team size was increased from 9 to 10 in 1988 and the format has been unchanged since then, the only variation being the order of the foursomes and fourballs on the first two days.

Year	Day 1		Day 2		Day 3		Total Points
Year	Morning	Afternoon	Morning	Afternoon	Morning	Afternoon	Total Points
1973–74	4 foursomes	4 fourballs	8 singles		–		16
1975–76	4 foursomes		4 fourballs		8 singles		16
1977–79	4 foursomes		4 fourballs		9 singles		17
1980	3 fourballs	3 foursomes	3 fourballs	3 foursomes	9 singles		21
1981–84	3 foursomes	3 fourballs	3 fourballs	3 foursomes	9 singles		21
1986	4 foursomes	4 fourballs	4 fourballs	4 foursomes	9 singles		25
1988–2005	4 foursomes	4 fourballs	4 foursomes	4 fourballs	10 singles		26
2007–date	4 foursomes	4 fourballs	4 foursomes	4 fourballs	10 singles		26
2007–date	or		or		10 singles		26
2007–date	4 fourballs	4 foursomes	4 fourballs	4 foursomes	10 singles		26

== Results ==
Year	Winners	Score	Host country	Venue	USA captain	GB&I captain	Ref
PGA Cup
2026	GB&I	19 1/2–9 1/2	Ireland	K Club	Ben Polland	David Scott	
2024	USA	17 1/2–8 1/2	USA	Sunriver Resort, Oregon	Jim Richerson	Tim Rouse	
2022	USA	15 1/2–10 1/2	England	Foxhills Club & Resort	Suzy Whaley	David J. Russell	
2019	USA	14–12	USA	Barton Creek Resort, Texas	Derek Sprague	Cameron Clark	
2017	GB&I	16–10	England	Foxhills Club & Resort	Paul K. Levy	Albert MacKenzie	
2015	GB&I	13 1/2–12 1/2	USA	CordeValle, California	Allen Wronowski	Jon Bevan	
2013	Tied	13–13	England	Slaley Hall	Allen Wronowski	Russell Weir	
2011	USA	17 1/2–8 1/2	USA	CordeValle, California	Jim Remy	Russell Weir	
2009	USA	17 1/2–8 1/2	Scotland	The Carrick on Loch Lomond	Brian Whitcomb	Gary Alliss	
2007	USA	13 1/2–12 1/2	USA	Reynolds Plantation, Georgia	Roger Warren	Gary Alliss	
2005	GB&I	15–11	Ireland	K Club	M.G. Orender	Jim Farmer	
2003	USA	19–7	USA	PGA Golf Club, Port St Lucie, Florida	Jack Connelly and Will Mann	David Jones	
2000	USA	13 1/2–12 1/2	Wales	Celtic Manor	Ken Lindsay	David Llewellyn	
1998	USA	17–9	USA	Broadmoor Resort, Colorado	Tom Addis III	Craig Defoy	
1996	Tied	13–13	Scotland	Gleneagles	Gary Schaal	Craig Defoy	
1994	USA	15–11	USA	PGA National, Florida	Dick Smith	Mike Ingham	
1992	USA	15–11	Ireland	K Club	Patrick J. Rielly	Paul Leonard	
1990	USA	19–7	USA	Turtle Point GC, South Carolina	James Ray Carpenter	Richard Bradbeer	
1988	USA	15 1/2–10 1/2	England	The Belfry	Mickey Powell	David Huish	
1986	USA	16–9	USA	Knollwood, Illinois	Mark Kizziar	Derek Nash	
1984	GB&I	12 1/2–8 1/2	Scotland	Turnberry	Joe Black	Keith Hockey	
1983	GB&I	14 1/2–6 1/2	Scotland	Muirfield	Joe Black	Keith Hockey	
1982	USA	13 1/2–7 1/2	USA	Holston Hills, Tennessee	Don Padgett	David Jones	
1981	Tied	10 1/2–10 1/2	USA	Turnberry Isle, Florida	Joe Black	Doug Smith	
1980	USA	15–6	USA	Oak Tree, Oklahoma	Don Padgett	David Talbot	
1979	GB&I	12 1/2–4 1/2	Isle of Man	Castletown	Don Padgett	Bill Watson	
1978	GB&I	10 1/2–6 1/2	England	St Mellion	Henry Poe	Tommy Horton	
1977	Tied	8 1/2–8 1/2	USA	Mission Hills, California	Henry Poe	Jack Hargreaves	
1976	USA	9 1/2–6 1/2	England	Moortown	Frank Cardi	George Will	
1975	USA	9 1/2–6 1/2	England	Hillside	Don Padgett	Christy O'Connor Snr	
Diamondhead Cup
1974	USA	11 1/2–4 1/2	USA	Pinehurst, North Carolina	Henry Poe	Bryon Hutchinson	
1973	USA	13–3	USA	Pinehurst, North Carolina	William Clarke	Tom Haliburton	

United States have won 20 times, Great Britain & Ireland 8 times with 4 ties.

== Appearances ==
The following are those who have played in at least one of the matches.

=== United States ===
- Rick Acton 1986, 1994
- Jim Albus 1977, 1981, 1982
- Ken Allard 1986
- J. C. Anderson 2013
- Perry Arthur 1996
- Tommy Aycock 1978, 1979, 1980
- Danny Balin 2011, 2019
- Dave Barber 1978, 1980
- Jerry Barber 1974
- Rex Baxter 1974, 1976
- Alex Beach 2019, 2022
- George Bellino 1977
- Frank Bensel Jr. 2022
- Bob Benson 1975
- Steve Benson 1978, 1981
- Ryan Benzel 2007, 2009
- Rich Berberian, Jr. 2017, 2019
- Brian Bergstol 2026
- Don Berry 2003
- Scott Bess 1986, 1988
- Brandon Bingaman 2026
- Michael Block 2015, 2022, 2024
- Gene Borek 1973, 1976, 1981, 1983
- Bob Borowicz 1992
- George Bowman 1994
- Bob Boyd 1990, 2000
- Stan Brion 1974
- Jamie Broce 2015, 2017
- Mark Brown 2000, 2017
- Bob Bruno 1973, 1979
- Mike Burke Jr. 1998
- Kevin Burton 2000
- Matt Cahill 2024
- Doug Campbell 1980
- Jason Caron 2019
- Walt Chapman 1994
- Paul Claxton 2017
- Tom Cleaver 1994
- Tyler Collet 2024, 2026
- Tim Collins 1977, 1978, 1979, 1984
- Ben Cook 2019
- Richard Crawford 1982
- Stuart Deane 2015
- John DeForest 1996
- Wayne DeFrancesco 2003
- Frank Dobbs 2000
- Matt Dobyns 2013, 2015, 2017
- Sean Dougherty 2015
- Jesse Droemer 2026
- Bob Duden 1977
- Tim Dunlavey 2000
- John Elliott, Jr. 1984
- Charlie Epps 1986
- Scott Erdmann 2011
- Barry Evans 2003
- Eddie Famula 1975
- Jim Ferree 1979
- Jim Ferriell 1977
- Gene Fieger 1992, 1998
- Bruce Fleisher 1990
- Kyle Flinton 2009
- Terry Florence 1980, 1984
- Bob Ford 1981, 1984, 1990, 1996, 2005
- Jeff Freeman 2000
- Ray Freeman 1986, 1990
- Dale Fuller 1990
- Brian Gaffney 2000
- Mal Galletta 1973
- Bob Galloway 1977
- Bob Gaus 1998
- John Gentile 1979
- Ernie George 1973
- Gibby Gilbert 1988
- Larry Gilbert 1976, 1977, 1981, 1982, 1983, 1992
- Mike Gill 2000
- Mike Gilmore 2003
- David Glenz 1984, 1988
- Randy Glover 1975, 1976, 1980
- Larkin Gross 2022
- Laurie Hammer 1978
- Phil Hancock 1990
- Zach Haynes 2026
- Scott Hebert 2009
- Austin Hurt 2026
- Denis Husse 1983
- David Hutsell 2011
- Stu Ingraham 1990, 1996
- Bill Israelson 1996
- John Jackson 1981, 1982
- Tommy Jacobs 1974
- Faber Jamerson 2011
- Marty Jertson 2011, 2019
- David Jimenez 1976
- Chip Johnson 2005
- Jared Jones 2022, 2024
- Michael Kartude 2026
- Shawn Kelly 2000
- Roger Kennedy 1980, 1981
- Ben Kern 2019, 2026
- Darrell Kestner 1998
- Jim King 1983
- Rob Labritz 2003
- George Lanning 1977
- Jeff Lankford 1998
- Brad Lardon 2011
- John Lee 1994
- Ryan Lenahan 2026
- Bob Lendzion 1983, 1988
- Ron Letellier 1975
- J. L. Lewis 1994
- Jack Lewis Jr. 1980
- Babe Lichardus 1973, 1975
- Eric Lippert 2009
- Jim Logue 1974, 1982, 1983
- Travis Long 2005
- Jay Lumpkin 1988
- Denny Lyons 1973, 1974
- Larry Mancour 1974
- Brad Marek 2024
- Don Massengale 1973, 1982
- O'Dell Massey 1975
- Rives McBee 1973, 1974, 1976, 1978
- Sean McCarty 2019
- Rob McClellan 2011
- Ron McDougal 1992, 1994, 1998
- Dave McNabb 2017
- Brett Melton 2005
- Bob Menne 1988
- Mark Mielke 1998
- Kelly Mitchum 2013
- John Molenda 1974
- Alan Morin 2003, 2015
- Kevin Morris 1983, 1986
- Jesse Mueller 2022, 2024
- Dan Murphy 1984
- Lonnie Nielsen 1988, 1996
- Pete Oakley 1994
- Jay Overton 1979, 1998
- Don Padgett II 1976, 1981, 1982, 1984
- Rod Perry 2013, 2017
- Ron Philo, Jr. 2005, 2007
- Ben Polland 2015, 2022, 2024
- Ryan Polzin 2013
- Art Proctor 1978
- Sammy Rachels 1990, 1996
- Adam Rainaud 2017
- Lee Rinker 1992, 2007, 2009
- Tom Robertson 1983
- Gary Robinson 1982
- Jeff Roth 1988, 1994, 1996
- Mike San Filippo 1992
- Garrett Sapp 2026
- Steve Schneiter 1996, 2009
- Mike Schuchart 1992
- Alan Schulte 2007
- Bill Schumaker 1986
- Jack Seltzer 1983
- Craig Shankland 1973
- Butch Sheehan 2007
- Mark Sheftic 2009, 2011, 2013
- Jerry Shortridge 1979, 1980
- Sonny Skinner 2009, 2011
- Mike Small 2005, 2007, 2009, 2011, 2013
- Ron Smith 1978
- Todd Smith 1994
- John Somers 2024
- Jack Sommers 1979
- Jeff Sorenson 2013
- Bob Sowards 2005, 2013, 2015, 2019
- Scott Spence 2005
- Josh Speight 2017
- Chris Starkjohann 2007
- Craig Stevens 2003
- Rich Steinmetz 2005
- Wheeler Stewart 1986
- Grant Sturgeon 2015
- Chip Sullivan 2007, 2013
- Bruce Summerhays 1977, 1978
- Andrew Svoboda 2024
- Tim Thelen 2000, 2003, 2005, 2007
- Craig Thomas 2009
- Kim Thompson 1990
- Jeff Thomsen 1990
- David Thore 1988
- Dennis Tiziani 1976
- John Traub 1981
- Chris Tucker 1998
- Brett Upper 1992
- Omar Uresti 2015, 2017, 2022
- Maurice Ver Brugge 1975
- Steve Veriato 1992
- Ryan Vermeer 2019, 2022
- Robby Ware 1996
- Tom Wargo 1988, 1992
- Roger Watson 1975, 1976
- Larry Webb 1984
- Tim Weinhart 2003
- Jeremy Wells 2024
- Jim White 1986
- Buddy Whitten 1980
- Wyatt Worthington II 2022
- Jimmy Wright 1975, 1979, 1982
- Bob Wynn 1984
- Don Yrene 2007
- Bruce Zabriski 1998, 2003

=== Great Britain and Ireland ===
Initially the team was based entirely on the PGA Club Professionals' Championship. The leading nine available players in that event qualified, there being a sudden-death playoff when there was tie for 9th place. In 1973 Adrian Sadler tied for third place but later withdrew and was replaced by Bryon Hutchinson, who had earlier lost a playoff for the final place. In 1974 Ken Redford finished in a qualifying position but had decided not to travel. In 1979 George Will qualified after finishing tied for 3rd position but later withdrew and was replaced by Jim Farmer. In 1980 Brian Waites, who finished third, had previously announced that we would not play in the PGA Cup. There was a three-way tie for 10th place. George Will declined to play in it and Leonard Owens gained the final place by beating Peter Tupling in a playoff. The system remained the same in 1986, even though the event had become biennial.

In 1988 the teams were increased to 10. The selection process was also revised. Eight members of the team gained entry via the PGA Club Professionals' Championship with the captain David Huish having two "wildcard" selections. Huish chose the players who had finished 9th and 10th, Nick Job and John Chillas. In 1990 the event was opened to the golfers from continental Europe. Only seven player qualified from the club professionals' championship, with the winner of European teaching professionals championship at Broekpolder in the Netherlands, gaining a place. There was a three-way tie for two places in the club professionals' championship but the captain Richard Bradbeer announced that he would use one of his wildcard picks for the losing player. so all three were selected. His other pick was Brian Barnes who had not played but had won it the previous year. Dutch-based John Woof gained the final place by winner the Broekpolder event. In 1992 John Chillas and Russell Weir were the wildcard selections with Dutch-based Tim Giles gaining the final place by winning in Broekpolder.

In 1994 the team was selected using a system in which points were allocated in both the 1993 and 1994 PGA Club Professionals' Championships.

- Ben Amor 2026
- Phillip Archer 2017
- Robert Arnott 2003
- Keith Ashdown 1988
- Andrew Baguley 1994, 2005
- Benn Barham 2013
- Brian Barnes 1990
- Jonathan Barnes 2013
- Will Barnes 2009
- Andrew Barnett 2007, 2009
- Sion Bebb 2000
- Graeme Bell 2003
- Stephen Bennett 1998
- Jon Bevan 2007, 2009
- Alec Bickerdike 1980
- Nicolas Brennan 2013
- Dan Brown 2024
- Gary Brown 2011
- Nick Brown 1996
- David Butler 1984
- Peter Butler 1978, 1979, 1981, 1982, 1984
- David Callaway 2013
- Bob Cameron 1981, 1983, 1984, 2000, 2003
- Paul Carman 1990, 1996
- Harry Casey 2026
- Alex Caygill 1974
- John Chillas 1982, 1983, 1984, 1988, 1992
- Cameron Clark 2015
- Lee Clarke 2015
- Robert Coles 2017, 2019
- Ian Collins 1982
- Matthew Cort 2017, 2019, 2022, 2024
- Peter Cowen 1992
- David Creamer 1974
- Christopher Currie 2017
- Gareth Davies 2024, 2026
- Craig Defoy 1981, 1984
- Kevin Dickens 1998
- Richard Dinsdale 2005
- David Dixon 2015, 2019
- David Dunk 1982, 1983
- Denis Durnian 1981, 1982, 1984, 1986
- John Dwyer 2000, 2003, 2007
- Simon Edwards 2003, 2005, 2011
- Matthew Ellis 2005
- Pip Elson 1986
- Richard Emery 1973
- Brian Evans 1978
- Jim Farmer 1977, 1979, 1980, 1983
- Max Faulkner 1975
- Bill Ferguson 1973, 1976
- Roger Fidler 1975
- Matt Ford 2026
- Alastair Forsyth 2019
- Graham Fox 2013, 2015
- James Freeman 2026
- Ged Furey 1988
- Mike Gallagher 1977
- Andrew George 1998
- Robert Giles 2011
- Tim Giles 1992
- Christopher Gill 2011
- Jordan Godwin 2019
- Craig Goodfellow 2007, 2011
- Martin Gray 1983, 1986, 1988
- John Greaves 1998
- Daniel Greenwood 2013
- Chris Hall 1992, 1994, 2000
- Stephen Hamill 2000
- Andrew Hare 2003
- Jamie Harris 2009
- John Harrison 1994
- Peter Harrison 1980
- Gavin Hay 2026
- Scott Henderson 2013
- Paul Hendriksen 2015
- David Higgins 2017, 2022
- Joe Higgins 1994, 1996
- Philip Hinton 1988
- Vince Hood 1974, 1976
- John Hoskison 1988, 1992
- Garry Houston 2017
- David Huish 1974, 1975, 1977, 1978, 1979, 1980, 1984, 1986
- Toby Hunt 2024, 2026
- Greig Hutcheon 2013, 2017, 2022
- Bryon Hutchinson 1973
- Mike Ingham 1976, 1977, 1978, 1983
- David Ingram 1976, 1984
- David Jagger 1980
- Bob Jamieson 1974, 1975
- Nick Job 1988, 1992, 1994, 1996
- David Jones 1976, 1977, 1978, 1979, 1981, 1992, 1994
- Ernie Jones 1976
- Kevin Jones 1988
- Michael Jones 1998
- Niall Kearney 2015
- John Kennedy 2011
- Adam Keogh 2022, 2024
- Jimmy Kinsella 1977
- Gordon Law 1996, 2003, 2005
- Craig Lee 2019, 2024
- James Lee 2009
- Paul Leonard 1979, 1982
- Jason Levermore 2015, 2019
- Simon Lilly 2022
- Stuart Little 2011
- Bill Longmuir 1996, 2003
- Bob Longworth 1986
- Michael Macara 1998
- Craig Maltman 1992, 1994
- Fraser Mann 1996, 2005
- Robin Mann 1994
- Ashley Mansell 2022, 2026
- Craig Matheson 2009
- Christopher McDonnell 2017
- Brendan McGovern 1996, 2003
- Damien McGrane 2000, 2017
- George McKay 1978
- Paul McKechnie 2022, 2024
- Steven McKenna 1996
- John McTear 1980
- David Melville 1973
- David Miller 1974
- Willie Milne 1982, 1986
- Tony Minshall 1980, 1983
- John Morgan 1973, 1979, 1981
- Colm Moriarty 2024
- David Mortimer 2011
- Bill Murray 1974
- Duncan Muscroft 2007
- Tony Nash 2000, 2005
- Michael Nesbit 2007
- Geoff Norton 1973
- Paul O'Hara 2019
- Leonard Owens 1977, 1980
- Darren Parris 2005
- Andrew Raitt 2017
- Tim Rastall 1990
- Mark Reynolds 2005
- Ian Richardson 1975
- David Ridley 1979, 1981
- Brian Rimmer 1992, 1998
- Graeme Robertson 2026
- Jeremy Robinson 2009
- Keith Robson 1986
- James Ruth 2022, 2024
- George Ryall 2007
- Adrian Sadler 1975
- Denis Scanlon 1975
- David Scott 1990
- David Screeton 1990
- Doug Sewell 1973, 1974, 1975
- David Shacklady 2011
- John Sharkey 1976
- Paul Simpson 1998, 2009
- Gary Smith 1986
- Kevin Stables 1990
- Gary Stafford 1988
- Mike Steadman 1979, 1981
- Hogan Stott 1994, 2000
- Barry Taylor 2009
- Daniel Taylor 2007
- Alistair Thomson 1978, 1983
- Simon Thornton 2022, 2026
- David Thorp 1980
- Gordon Townhill 1977
- Peter Tupling 1978
- David Vaughan 1982, 1984
- Brian Waites 1973, 1975, 1976, 1977, 1978, 1979, 1990
- James Walker 2024
- Richard Wallis 2013, 2019
- Peter Ward 1974, 1976
- Michael Watson 2015
- Phil Weaver 1982, 1983
- Alastair Webster 1990
- Russell Weir 1986, 1988, 1990, 1992, 1994, 1996, 1998, 2000
- John Wells 2011
- Paul Wesselingh 1998, 2000, 2003, 2005, 2007, 2009
- James Whatley 2007
- Daniel Whitby-Smith 2022
- Jack Wilkshire 1973
- John Woof 1990
- Gareth Wright 2013, 2015
- Alex Wrigley 2015, 2019
- John Yeo 1981
