= Vanstiphout =

Vanstiphout is a surname. Notable people with the surname include:

- Herman Vanstiphout (1941–2019), Dutch assyriologist
- Jos Vanstiphout (1951–2013), Belgian sports psychologist
- Tom Vanstiphout (born 1975), Belgian guitarist and singer
