= Lusaka Open =

Golf tournament

Tournament information
- Location: Lusaka, Zambia
- Established: 1969
- Course(s): Lusaka Golf Club
- Tour(s): Safari Circuit
- Format: Stroke play
- Final year: 1979

Final champion
- (England) John Morgan

The Lusaka Open was a men's professional golf tournament played at Lusaka Golf Club in Zambia between 1969 and 1979. It was one of three Zambian events on the Safari Circuit schedule.

The event pre-dated the Zambia Open which was first contested in 1972. The Lusaka Golf Club first hosted the Zambia Open in 1973 and again in 1976, 1978 and annually from 1980 to 1993. The Lusaka Open was not held in those years. The event went under a variety of names being called the Lusaka Dunlop Open in 1970 and 1971 and the Eagle Open in 1969 and 1974.

The 1974 event was reduced to 54 holes because of bad weather.

== Winners ==
Year	Winner	Country	Score	To par	Margin of victory	Runner(s)-up	Ref
1979	John Morgan	England	282	−10	3 strokes	Trevor Powell	
1978	No tournament						
1977	Mark James	England	279	−13	1 stroke	(England) Gary Cullen	
1976	No tournament						
1975	Carl Mason	England	281	−11	4 strokes	(England) Guy Hunt	
1974	Willie Milne	Scotland	213	−3	1 stroke	(England) Guy Hunt (England) David Jagger	
1973	No tournament						
1972	Maurice Bembridge	England	274		1 stroke	(England) Doug McClelland	
1971	Stuart Brown	England	280		1 stroke	(England) Alex Caygill	
1970	Alex Caygill	England	285	−7	2 strokes	(Wales) Craig Defoy	
1969	Bernard Gallacher	Scotland	284		4 strokes	(Scotland) Brian Barnes	
