= Robert Lee (golfer) =

English golfer and television presenter

Personal information
- Full name: Robert Lee
- Nationality: England
- Born: 12 October 1961 (age 65) London, England
- Height: 6 ft 1 in (1.85 m)
- Weight: 176 lb (80 kg; 12.6 st)

Career
- Sport: Golf
- Turned professional: 1982
- Former tour: European Tour
- Professional wins: 5

Number of wins by tour
- European Tour: 2
- Challenge Tour: 2
- Other: 1

Best results in major championships
- Masters Tournament: DNP
- PGA Championship: DNP
- U.S. Open: DNP
- The Open Championship: T21: 1986

Robert Lee (born 12 October 1961) is an English professional golfer and television presenter.

== Career ==
In 1961, Lee was born in London.

In 1982, he turned professional. He was in his prime from 1985 to 1987 finishing in the top thirty of the European Tour Order of Merit each of those years. He twice shot 27 for nine holes on the tour, first at the 1985 Monte Carlo Open, and again two years later at the 1987 Portuguese Open. He went on to win the latter, one of his two victories on the European Tour. He also seriously competed for the 1985 Open Championship in the opening rounds. He was in second place after the first round and only two back after the second round. He faded over the weekend but picked up a top-25 finish.

From the late 1980s Lee's form dipped, and he spent the latter half of the 1990s going back and forth between the second-tier Challenge Tour and the main European Tour. Since leaving the tour at the end of the 1999 season, Lee has worked as an analyst for Sky Sports.

== Professional wins (5) ==
=== European Tour wins (2) ===
No.	Date	Tournament	Winning score	Margin of victory	Runner-up
1	13 Oct 1985	Compagnie de Chauffe Cannes Open	−8 (71-68-72-69=280)	Playoff	(Wales) David Llewellyn
2	1 Nov 1987	Portuguese Open	−12 (61-67-67=195) (Note: Shortened to 54 holes due to weather.)	1 stroke	(Scotland) Sam Torrance

European Tour playoff record (1–0)

No.	Year	Tournament	Opponent	Result
1	1985	Compagnie de Chauffe Cannes Open	(Wales) David Llewellyn	Won with par on first extra hole

=== Challenge Tour wins (2) ===
No.	Date	Tournament	Winning score	Margin of victory	Runner(s)-up
1	5 May 1996	Canarias Challenge	−16 (68-65-68-67=268)	5 strokes	(England) Simon Burnell, (Sweden) Joakim Rask
2	3 Jul 1998	MasterCard Challenge	−11 (74-69-68-66=277)	3 strokes	(England) Richard Bland

Challenge Tour playoff record (0–1)

No.	Year	Tournament	Opponents	Result
1	1996	Kenya Open	(England) Phil Harrison, (Scotland) Mike Miller	Miller won with par on first extra hole

=== Other wins (1) ===
No.	Date	Tournament	Winning score	Margin of victory	Runners-up
1	10 Nov 1985	Brazil Open	E (71-66-64-71=272)	1 stroke	(Argentina) Horacio Carbonetti, (Spain) Miguel Ángel Martín, (Northern Ireland) Ronan Rafferty, (Argentina) Eduardo Romero, (Argentina) Adan Sowa

== Results in major championships ==
Tournament	1985	1986	1987	1988	1989	1990	1991	1992	1993	1994	1995	1996
The Open Championship	T25	T21	CUT	CUT					CUT			CUT

Note: Lee only played in The Open Championship.

Did not play

CUT = missed the half-way cut
"T" = tied
