= Kenya Open =

Golf tournament

Coordinates: 1.3412°S 36.7152°E

Magical Kenya Open

Tournament information
- Location: Nairobi, Kenya
- Established: 1967
- Course: Karen Country Club
- Par: 70
- Length: 7,228 yards (6,609 m)
- Tours: European Tour; Challenge Tour; Safari Circuit
- Format: Stroke play
- Prize fund: US$2,700,000
- Month played: February

Tournament record score
- Aggregate: 255 Casey Jarvis (2026)
- To par: −25 as above

Current champion
- (South Africa) Casey Jarvis

Final champion
- Location in Kenya

The Kenya Open, currently titled as the Magical Kenya Open for sponsorship reasons, is a professional golf tournament in Kenya founded in 1967.

== History ==
The Kenya Open was an associate event on the Far East Circuit in 1967 and 1968, after which it became a cornerstone of the emerging Safari Circuit – a collection of tournaments initially in Kenya and Zambia, and then later in Nigeria, Ivory Coast and Zimbabwe. The European Tour, who had taken over running of the Safari Tour in the late 1970s, began to expand globally through the 1980s and those events formally became part of the second tier Challenge Tour in 1991. With the exception of the 1994 event, the Kenya Open remained on the Challenge Tour schedule until 2019 when it was elevated to the elite European Tour schedule.

In 2019, the tournament became a European Tour event and was played in mid-March during the same week as The Players Championship on the PGA Tour.

The tournament has always been held near Nairobi, either at Muthaiga Golf Club (1967, 1969–2002, 2009–2012, 2017–2018, 2022–2023) or at Karen Country Club (1968, 2004–2008, 2013–2016, 2019, 2021).

The title has been won by some of Europe's Ryder Cup golfers, including Seve Ballesteros, Ian Woosnam, Ken Brown, Edoardo Molinari and Christy O'Connor Jnr, as well as future Masters champion Trevor Immelman. The most successful player is Maurice Bembridge, who recorded three victories between 1968 and 1979.

== Winners ==
| Year | Tour (Note: AGC/FEC − Asia Golf Circuit/Far East Circuit. CHA − Challenge Tour; EUR − European Tour; SAF − Safari Circuit.) | Winner | Score | To par | Margin of victory | Runner(s)-up | Venue | Ref. |
Magical Kenya Open
| 2026 | EUR | (South Africa) Casey Jarvis | 255 | −25 | 3 strokes | (United States) Davis Bryant | Karen | |
| 2025 | EUR | (South Africa) Jacques Kruyswijk | 266 | −18 | 2 strokes | (England) John Parry | Muthaiga | |
| 2024 | EUR | (Netherlands) Darius van Driel | 270 | −14 | 2 strokes | (England) Joe Dean (Spain) Nacho Elvira | Muthaiga | |
| 2023 | EUR | (Spain) Jorge Campillo | 266 | −18 | 2 strokes | (Japan) Masahiro Kawamura | Muthaiga | |
| 2022 | EUR | (China) Wu Ashun | 268 | −16 | 4 strokes | (Canada) Aaron Cockerill (South Africa) Thriston Lawrence (Germany) Hurly Long | Muthaiga | |
| 2021 | EUR | (South Africa) Justin Harding | 263 | −21 | 2 strokes | (United States) Kurt Kitayama | Karen | |
| 2020 | EUR | Cancelled due to the COVID-19 pandemic | | | | | | |
| 2019 | EUR | (Italy) Guido Migliozzi | 268 | −16 | 1 stroke | (Spain) Adri Arnaus (South Africa) Louis de Jager (South Africa) Justin Harding | Karen | |
Barclays Kenya Open
| 2018 | CHA | (Italy) Lorenzo Gagli | 273 | −11 | Playoff | (Sweden) Jens Fahrbring | Muthaiga | |
| 2017 | CHA | (England) Aaron Rai | 267 | −17 | 3 strokes | (France) Adrien Saddier | Muthaiga | |
| 2016 | CHA | (Sweden) Sebastian Söderberg | 270 | −18 | 3 strokes | (France) Romain Langasque | Karen | |
| 2015 | CHA | (South Africa) Haydn Porteous | 271 | −17 | Playoff | (South Africa) Brandon Stone | Karen | |
| 2014 | CHA | (South Africa) Jake Roos | 278 | −10 | 1 stroke | (France) Adrien Bernadet (Denmark) Lasse Jensen (Spain) Pedro Oriol | Karen | |
| 2013 | CHA | (Spain) Jordi García Pinto | 272 | −12 | 1 stroke | (Netherlands) Tim Sluiter | Karen | |
| 2012 | CHA | (England) Seve Benson | 274 | −10 | Playoff | (Denmark) Lasse Jensen | Muthaiga | |
| 2011 | CHA | (South Africa) Michiel Bothma | 270 | −14 | 2 strokes | (South Africa) Tyrone Ferreira | Muthaiga | |
Kenya Open
| 2010 | CHA | (England) Robert Dinwiddie | 272 | −12 | 3 strokes | (Argentina) Julio Zapata | Muthaiga | |
Tusker Kenya Open
| 2009 | CHA | (England) Gary Boyd | 271 | −13 | 4 strokes | (England) Andrew Butterfield (England) Philip Golding | Muthaiga | |
| 2008 | CHA | (England) Iain Pyman | 272 | −12 | 3 strokes | (Austria) Thomas Feyrsinger | Karen | |
| 2007 | CHA | (Italy) Edoardo Molinari | 274 | −6 | 1 stroke | (South Africa) James Kamte | Karen | |
| 2006 | CHA | (Sweden) Johan Axgren | 270 | −10 | 4 strokes | (England) James Hepworth (England) Gary Lockerbie | Karen | |
| 2005 | CHA | (Argentina) Daniel Vancsik | 272 | −8 | 3 strokes | (South Africa) Michael Kirk | Karen | |
Kenya Open
| 2004 | CHA | (Zimbabwe) Marc Cayeux | 270 | −10 | Playoff | (Sweden) Leif Westerberg | Karen | |
2003: No tournament
Sameer Kenya Open
| 2002 | CHA | (England) Lee S. James | 265 | −19 | 3 strokes | (South Africa) Titch Moore | Muthaiga | |
Tusker Kenya Open
| 2001 | CHA | (South Africa) Ashley Roestoff | 271 | −13 | Playoff | (England) Andrew Sherborne | Muthaiga | |
| 2000 | CHA | (South Africa) Trevor Immelman | 270 | −14 | 4 strokes | (Sweden) Henrik Stenson | Muthaiga | |
| 1999 | CHA | (Netherlands) Maarten Lafeber | 265 | −19 | 3 strokes | (Sweden) Erik Andersson | Muthaiga | |
| 1998 | CHA | (Argentina) Ricardo González | 272 | −12 | Playoff | (Kenya) Jacob Okello | Muthaiga | |
Lonrho Kenya Open
| 1997 | CHA | (Argentina) Jorge Berendt | 268 | −16 | 4 strokes | (South Africa) Sammy Daniels | Muthaiga | |
Kenya Open
| 1996 | CHA | (Scotland) Mike Miller | 272 | −12 | Playoff | (England) Phil Harrison (England) Robert Lee | Muthaiga | |
| 1995 | CHA | (Wales) James Lee | 265 | −19 | 5 strokes | (Denmark) Thomas Bjørn (South Africa) Chris Williams | Muthaiga | |
| 1994 | | (England) Paul Carman | 276 | −8 | Playoff | (England) Glenn Ralph | Muthaiga | |
| 1993 | CHA | (Scotland) Craig Maltman | 276 | −8 | Playoff | (England) Peter Harrison (Sweden) Daniel Westermark | Muthaiga | |
Standard Chartered Kenya Open
| 1992 | CHA | (Switzerland) André Bossert | 272 | −12 | 1 stroke | (Scotland) Craig Maltman | Muthaiga | |
| 1991 | CHA | (England) Jeremy Robinson | 269 | −15 | 5 strokes | (Wales) Paul Affleck (England) Philip Golding (Scotland) Sandy Stephen | Muthaiga | |
555 Kenya Open
| 1990 | SAF | (Republic of Ireland) Christy O'Connor Jnr | 271 | −13 | 2 strokes | (England) Chris Platts | Muthaiga | |
| 1989 | SAF | (Northern Ireland) David Jones | 271 | −13 | 3 strokes | (Wales) Mark Mouland | Muthaiga | |
| 1988 | SAF | (England) Chris Platts | 271 | −13 | 1 stroke | (Wales) Mark Mouland | Muthaiga | |
| 1987 | SAF | (England) Carl Mason | 275 | −9 | Playoff | (England) Gordon J. Brand (England) Roger Chapman (England) Martin Poxon | Muthaiga | |
| 1986 | SAF | (Wales) Ian Woosnam | 273 | −11 | Playoff | (Scotland) Bill Longmuir | Muthaiga | |
| 1985 | SAF | (Scotland) Garry Harvey | 278 | −6 | 1 stroke | (England) Brian Waites | Muthaiga | |
| 1984 | SAF | (Spain) José María Cañizares | 277 | −7 | Playoff | (England) David J. Russell | Muthaiga | |
Benson & Hedges Kenya Open
| 1983 | SAF | (Scotland) Ken Brown | 274 | −10 | 1 stroke | (England) Jeff Hall | Muthaiga | |
| 1982 | SAF | (Republic of Ireland) Eamonn Darcy | 274 | −10 | 1 stroke | (England) David Jagger | Muthaiga | |
| 1981 | SAF | (Scotland) Brian Barnes | 274 | −10 | 1 stroke | (Scotland) Bernard Gallacher (Scotland) Sandy Lyle | Muthaiga | |
| 1980 | SAF | (England) Brian Waites | 271 | −13 | 1 stroke | (Scotland) Bill Longmuir | Muthaiga | |
| 1979 | SAF | (England) Maurice Bembridge (3) | 271 | −13 | Playoff | (Scotland) Bernard Gallacher | Muthaiga | |
Kenya Open
| 1978 | SAF | (Spain) Seve Ballesteros | 274 | −10 | 1 stroke | (Scotland) Bernard Gallacher | Muthaiga | |
| 1977 | SAF | (Republic of Ireland) Liam Higgins | 283 | −1 | 1 stroke | (England) Gary Smith (England) Bob Wynn | Muthaiga | |
| 1976: No tournament due to economic problems | | | | | | | | |
| 1975 | | (England) Gary Smith | 276 | −12 | Playoff | (Australia) Jack Newton | Muthaiga | |
| 1974 | | (England) David Jagger | 274 | −14 | 1 stroke | (England) Malcolm Gregson | Muthaiga | |
| 1973 | | (Netherlands) Jan Dorrestein (2) | 276 | −12 | 1 stroke | (England) David Jagger | Muthaiga | |
| 1972 | | (Wales) David Llewellyn | 279 | −9 | 2 strokes | (England) Peter Tupling | Muthaiga | |
| 1971 | | (Republic of Ireland) Ernie Jones | 283 | −5 | Playoff | (England) Russell Meek | Muthaiga | |
| 1970 | | (Netherlands) Jan Dorrestein | 273 | −15 | 14 strokes | (England) Malcolm Gregson (Scotland) Ronnie Shade (Australia) Bob Tuohy | Muthaiga | |
| 1969 | | (England) Maurice Bembridge (2) | 279 | −9 | 5 strokes | (Scotland) Bernard Gallacher (Zambia) Simon Hobday (a) | Muthaiga | |
| 1968 | AGC (Note: In 1967 and 1968 the event was sanctioned by the Asia Golf Circuit, however it was an unofficial money event; therefore the win is considered unofficial on that tour.) | (England) Maurice Bembridge | 289 | +1 | 2 strokes | (South Africa) Terry Westbrook | Karen | |
| 1967 | FEC | (England) Guy Wolstenholme | 279 | −9 | 4 strokes | (Australia) Peter Thomson | Muthaiga | |

== See also ==
- Open golf tournament
