= Scottish Young Professional Championship =

Tournament information
- Location: Scotland
- Established: 1958
- Format: stroke play

The Scottish Young Professional Championship is a golf tournament for young golfers that has been played since 1958. From its founding until 2002 it was known as the Scottish Assistants' Championship. Initially played over 36 holes it has generally been played over 72 since 1970.

== Winners ==
- 2022 Graeme Robertson
- 2021 Dominic Bradburn
- 2020 Scott Gillies
- 2019 Scott Grant
- 2018 Graeme McDougall
- 2017 Kris Nicol
- 2016 Paul O'Hara
- 2015 Paul O'Hara
- 2014 Gavin Hay
- 2013 Paul O'Hara
- 2012 Graeme Brown
- 2011 David Patrick
- 2010 David Patrick
- 2009 David Patrick
- 2008 Greg McBain
- 2007 Kenneth Glen
- 2006 Callum Nicoll
- 2005 Alan Lockhart
- 2004 Gerard Duncan
- 2003 Gary Dingwall
- 2002 Chris Kelly
- 2001 Chris Kelly
- 2000 Craig Lee
- 1999 Alastair Forsyth
- 1998 David Orr
- 1997 Martin Hastie
- 1996 Steven Thompson
- 1995 Alan Tait
- 1994 Scott Henderson
- 1993 John Wither
- 1992 Euan McIntosh
- 1991 Gordon Hume
- 1990 Paul Lawrie
- 1989 Colin Brooks
- 1988 Gary Collinson
- 1987 Calum Innes
- 1986 Philip Helsby
- 1985 Campbell Elliott
- 1984 Campbell Elliott
- 1983 Alastair Webster
- 1982 Robert Collinson
- 1981 Mark Brown
- 1980 Fraser Mann
- 1979 Niall Cameron
- 1978 Jim McCallum
- 1977 Steve Kelly
- 1976 Craig Maltman
- 1975 Craig Maltman
- 1974 Jim Noon
- 1973 Robin Fyfe
- 1972 Craig Maltman
- 1971 Jimmy Hamilton
- 1970 Bill Lockie
- 1969 Donald Ross
- 1968 Norman Wood
- 1967 Hugh McCorquodale
- 1966 Jack Steven
- 1965 David Huish
- 1964 Lew Taylor
- 1963 Bobby Walker
- 1962 Bobby Walker
- 1961 Bobby Walker
- 1960 Bobby Walker
- 1959 Billy McCondichie
- 1958 John Carter

Additional source:
