= Clubhaus Seniors Classic =

Tournament information
- Location: Witham, England
- Established: 1997
- Courses: Benton Hall Golf & Country Club
- Par: 72
- Tour: European Seniors Tour
- Format: Stroke play
- Prize fund: £75,000
- Month played: September
- Final year: 1997

Tournament record score
- Aggregate: 203 Tommy Horton (1997)
- To par: −13 as above

Final champion
- (England) Tommy Horton
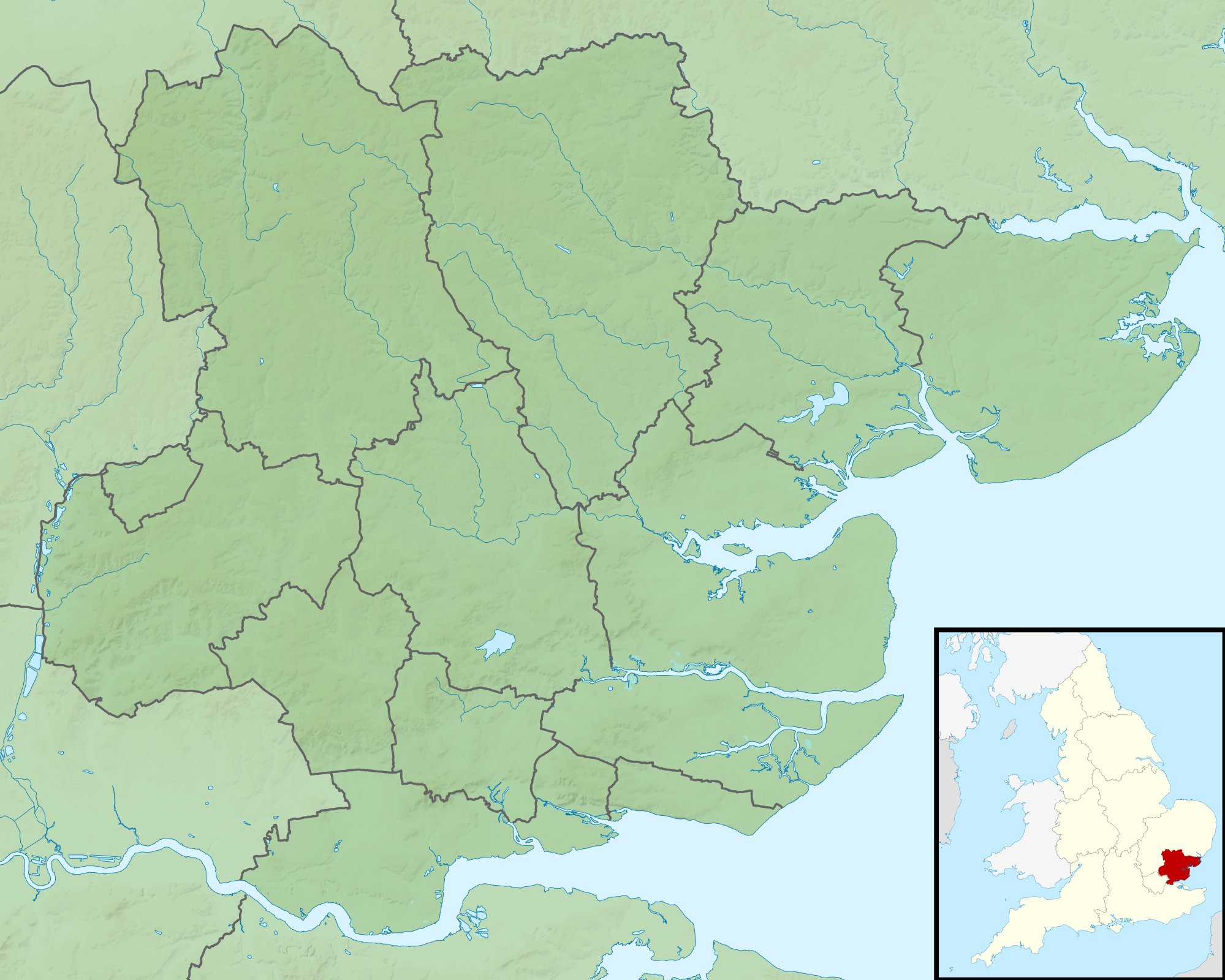
- Location in England Location in Essex

The Clubhaus Seniors Classic was a men's senior (over 50) professional golf tournament on the European Seniors Tour, held at the Benton Hall Golf & Country Club in Witham, Essex, England. It was held just once, in September 1997, and was won by Tommy Horton who finished two shots ahead of David Jones after a final found 64. Total prize money was £75,000 with the winner receiving £12,450.

== Winners ==
Year	Winner	Score	To par	Margin of victory	Runner-up
1997	(England) Tommy Horton	203	−13	2 strokes	(Northern Ireland) David Jones
