= Scottish Brewers Round-robin Tournament =

Tournament information
- Location: Scotland
- Established: 1983
- Format: round-robin match play
- Final year: 1985

The Scottish Brewers Round-robin Tournament was a golf tournament that was played in Scotland from 1983 to 1985. It was played in a round-robin format

There were 9 competitors in each tournament who played each of the other 8 in an 18-hole match play contest. Matches were played as a three-ball with three players playing a match against one another, each player playing two distinct matches. Two points were awarded for each match won while halved matches earned one point. Players qualified via a number of criteria, including the Order of Merit, a qualifying event and a sponsor's invitation.

== Winners ==
Year	Winner	Score	Margin of victory	Runner(s)-up	Winner's share (£)	Venue	Ref
1983	(Scotland) David Huish	13	1 point	(Scotland) Jim Farmer	2,000	Dalmahoy	
1984	(Scotland) David Matthew	13	2 points	(Scotland) Garry Harvey	2,000	Inverness	
1985	(Scotland) Russell Weir	15	4 points	(Scotland) Brian Barnes (Scotland) Keith Lobban	2,000	Dumphries & County	

In 1985 Barnes took second place prize money on "countback".
