= 1979 European Tour =

Golf tour season

1979 European Tour season
- Duration: 12 April 1979 – 6 October 1979
- Number of official events: 23
- Most wins: (Scotland) Sandy Lyle (3)
- Order of Merit: (Scotland) Sandy Lyle
- Sir Henry Cotton Rookie of the Year: (Scotland) Mike Miller

The 1979 European Tour, titled as the 1979 PGA European Golf Tour, was the eighth season of the European Tour, the main professional golf tour in Europe since its inaugural season in 1972.

== Changes for 1979 ==
There were several changes from the previous season, with the addition of the Welsh Golf Classic and Lada English Golf Classic. A new team event was also planned for France, replacing the Sumrie Better-Ball, but it was not held.

== Schedule ==
The following table lists official events during the 1979 season.

Date	Tournament	Host country	Purse (£)	Winner (Note: The number in brackets after each winner's name is the number of European Tour events they had won up to and including that tournament. This information is only shown for European Tour members and are inclusive of the three United States-based major championships which were included on the schedule for the first time in 1998, with earlier editions having retrospectively been recognised as official tour wins.)	Notes
15 Apr	Portuguese Open	Portugal	28,810	(Scotland) Brian Barnes (7)	
15 Apr	Masters Tournament	United States	US$299,625	(United States) Fuzzy Zoeller (n/a)	Major championship (Note: Unofficial money event at the time, but retrospectively counted as an official win.)
22 Apr	Spanish Open	Spain	35,000	(South Africa) Dale Hayes (4)	
29 Apr	Madrid Open	Spain	33,000	(South Africa) Simon Hobday (2)	
6 May	Italian Open	Italy	33,500	(Scotland) Brian Barnes (8)	
13 May	French Open	France	33,500	(Scotland) Bernard Gallacher (5)	
20 May	Colgate PGA Championship	England	50,000	(Argentina) Vicente Fernández (2)	
28 May	Martini International	England	42,000	(Australia) Greg Norman (2)	
3 Jun	B.A./Avis Open	Jersey	30,000	(Scotland) Sandy Lyle (1)	
10 Jun	Belgian Open	Belgium	32,300	(South Africa) Gavan Levenson (1)	
17 Jun	Welsh Golf Classic	Wales	30,000	(England) Mark James (2)	New tournament
17 Jun	U.S. Open	United States	US$325,000	(United States) Hale Irwin (n/a)	Major championship
24 Jun	Greater Manchester Open	England	30,000	(Southern Rhodesia) Mark McNulty (1)	
1 Jul	Lada English Golf Classic	England	50,000	(Spain) Seve Ballesteros (9)	New tournament
8 Jul	Scandinavian Enterprise Open	Sweden	35,000	(Scotland) Sandy Lyle (2)	
21 Jul	The Open Championship	Scotland	155,000	(Spain) Seve Ballesteros (10)	Major championship
29 Jul	Dutch Open	Netherlands	35,000	(Australia) Graham Marsh (5)	
5 Aug	Sun Alliance Match Play Championship	Scotland	40,000	(Republic of Ireland) Des Smyth (1)	
5 Aug	PGA Championship	United States	US$350,000	(Australia) David Graham (n/a)	Major championship
12 Aug	Benson & Hedges International Open	England	60,000	(England) Maurice Bembridge (6)	
19 Aug	Braun German Open	West Germany	32,000	(England) Tony Jacklin (6)	
26 Aug	Carroll's Irish Open	Ireland	60,000	(England) Mark James (3)	
2 Sep	Swiss Open	Switzerland	48,400	(South Africa) Hugh Baiocchi (5)	
9 Sep	European Open Championship	England	105,000	(Scotland) Sandy Lyle (3)	
23 Sep	SOS Talisman TPC	England	50,000	(England) Michael King (1)	
6 Oct	Dunlop Masters	Wales	60,000	(Australia) Graham Marsh (6)	

=== Unofficial events ===
The following events were sanctioned by the European Tour, but did not carry official money, nor were wins official.

Date	Tournament	Host country	Purse (£)	Winner(s)	Notes
18 Aug	News of the World Under-23 Match Play Championship	England	10,000	(Wales) Ian Woosnam	
16 Sep	Ryder Cup	United States	n/a	Team USA	Team event
30 Sep	Cacharel World Under-25 Championship	France	20,000	(West Germany) Bernhard Langer	
14 Oct	Suntory World Match Play Championship	England	110,000	(United States) Bill Rogers	Limited-field event
28 Oct	Trophée Lancôme	France	25,000	(United States) Johnny Miller	
11 Nov	World Cup	Greece	n/a	(United States) Hale Irwin and (United States) John Mahaffey	Team event
11 Nov	World Cup Individual Trophy	Greece	n/a	(United States) Hale Irwin	

== Order of Merit ==
The Order of Merit was based on tournament results during the season, calculated using a points-based system.

Position	Player	Points	Prize money (£)
1	(Scotland) Sandy Lyle	39,808	49,233
2	(Spain) Seve Ballesteros	37,026	47,411
3	(England) Mark James	32,494	38,534
4	(South Africa) Dale Hayes	30,031	32,540
5	(England) Michael King	26,283	29,725
6	(Scotland) Brian Barnes	26,218	28,204
7	(Scotland) Ken Brown	22,991	25,407
8	(Spain) Antonio Garrido	21,825	24,665
9	(England) Tony Jacklin	20,505	22,179
10	(England) Neil Coles	19,186	21,351

== Awards ==
Award	Winner	Ref.
Sir Henry Cotton Rookie of the Year	(Scotland) Mike Miller	
