= Dunbar Professional Championship =

Tournament information
- Location: Dunbar, Scotland
- Established: 1986
- Course(s): Dunbar Golf Club
- Format: stroke play
- Month played: April/May
- Final year: 1991

The Dunbar Professional Championship was a golf tournament that was played from 1986 to 1991. It was a 72-hole stroke-play event on the "Tartan Tour", the PGA in Scotland's schedule. Total prize money was £10,000, rising to £12,500 in 1990 and £14,000 in 1991. Russell Weir won three times in succession from 1988 to 1990.

== Winners ==
Year	Winner	Score	Margin of victory	Runner(s)-up	Winner's share (£)	Ref
1986	(Scotland) Mike Miller	279	2 strokes	(Scotland) George McKay (Scotland) Sandy Stephen	1,600	
1987	(Scotland) Colin Gillies	282	1 stroke	(Scotland) Mike Miller	1,600	
1988	(Scotland) Russell Weir	274	5 strokes	(Scotland) Steven Thompson	1,600	
1989	(Scotland) Russell Weir	277	6 strokes	(Scotland) Andrew Dickson	1,600	
1990	(Scotland) Russell Weir	278	5 strokes	(Scotland) Mike McLaren	2,000	
1991	(Scotland) Alastair Webster	278	3 strokes	(Scotland) Gary Orr	2,200	
