= Mike Miller (golfer) =

Scottish golfer

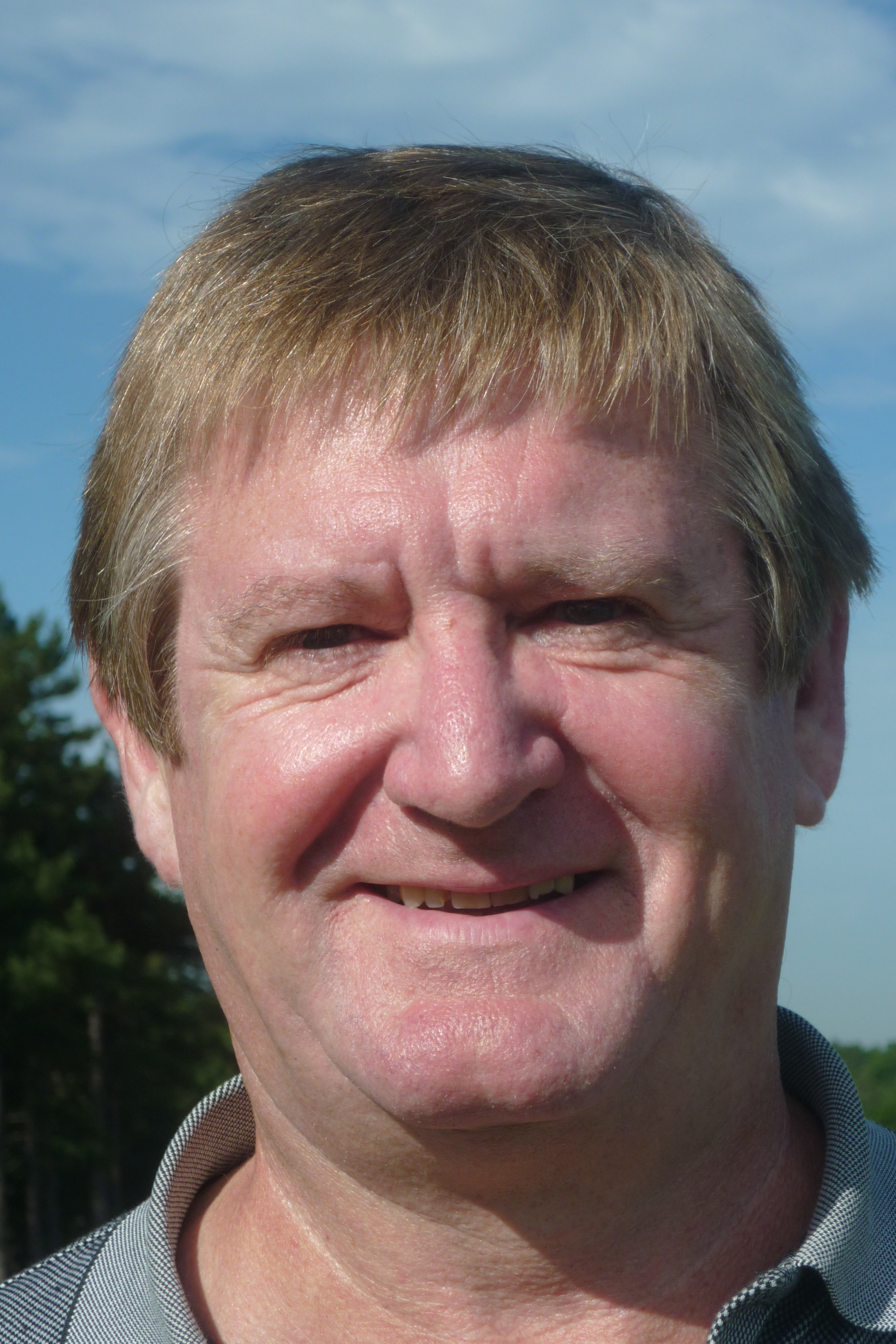

Personal information
- Full name: Michael John Miller
- Nationality: Scotland
- Born: 22 April 1951 (age 75) Lenzie, Scotland
- Height: 6 ft 0 in (1.83 m)

Career
- Sport: Golf
- Turned professional: 1978
- Current tour: European Seniors Tour
- Former tour: European Tour
- Professional wins: 8

Number of wins by tour
- Challenge Tour: 1
- European Senior Tour: 1
- Other: 5 (regular); 1 (senior)

Best results in major championships
- Masters Tournament: DNP
- PGA Championship: DNP
- U.S. Open: DNP
- The Open Championship: T32: 1982, 1991

Achievements and awards
- Sir Henry Cotton Rookie of the Year: 1979

Michael John Miller (born 22 April 1951) is a Scottish professional golfer.

== Career ==
In 1951, Miller was born in Lenzie, East Dunbartonshire, near Glasgow, Scotland. In 1978, he turned professional at the relatively late age of 27. He was the European Tour's Sir Henry Cotton Rookie of the Year in 1979. That year he lost a playoff to Mark James at the Welsh Golf Classic.

For the remainder of his career, however, he never came closer than that to winning a European Tour event. However, he finished second at the 1983 Kronenbourg Open. His best ranking on the European Tour Order of Merit was 47th in 1981.

However, Miller he has won several professional tournaments, including one each on the Challenge Tour and the European Seniors Tour, which he joined in 2001.

== Professional wins (8) ==
=== Challenge Tour wins (1) ===
No.	Date	Tournament	Winning score	Margin of victory	Runners-up
1	25 Feb 1996	Kenya Open	−12 (68-66-66-72=272)	Playoff	(England) Phil Harrison, (England) Robert Lee

Challenge Tour playoff record (1–0)

No.	Year	Tournament	Opponents	Result
1	1996	Kenya Open	(England) Phil Harrison, (England) Robert Lee	Won with par on first extra hole

=== Other wins (5) ===
- 1981 Sierra Leone Open
- 1982 Sierra Leone Open
- 1986 Dunbar Professional Championship
- 1990 Daily Express Scottish National Pro-am
- 1998 Sunderland of Scotland Masters

=== European Seniors Tour wins (1) ===
No.	Date	Tournament	Winning score	Margin of victory	Runners-up
1	24 Aug 2003	Nigel Mansell Classic	−11 (67-66-72=205)	2 strokes	(Jamaica) Delroy Cambridge, (England) Denis Durnian, (Australia) Terry Gale, (Republic of Ireland) Denis O'Sullivan, (Australia) Ian Stanley

=== Other senior wins (1) ===
- 2001 Belleisle Hotels Giles insurance Scottish PGA Seniors Championship

== Playoff record ==
European Tour playoff record (0–1)

No.	Year	Tournament	Opponents	Result
1	1979	Welsh Golf Classic	(England) Mark James, (Northern Ireland) Eddie Polland	James won with par on third extra hole Polland eliminated by birdie on second hole

== Results in major championships ==
Tournament	1978	1979	1980	1981	1982	1983	1984	1985	1986	1987
The Open Championship	T44			CUT	T32	CUT				

Tournament	1988	1989	1990	1991	1992	1993	1994	1995	1996	1997
The Open Championship				T32		T70				CUT

Note: Miller only played in The Open Championship.

Did not play

CUT = missed the half-way cut
"T" = tied

== Team appearances ==
- Europcar Cup (representing Scotland): 1988
