= Carnoustie Challenge =

Golf tournament held in Scotland

Tournament information
- Location: Carnoustie, Scotland
- Established: 1983
- Course(s): Carnoustie Golf Links
- Format: stroke play
- Month played: October
- Final year: 1994

The Carnoustie Challenge was a golf tournament that was played from 1983 to 1986. It was a 72-hole stroke-play event on the "Tartan Tour", the PGA in Scotland's schedule. Total prize money was £10,000. The event continued as the Daily Express Scottish National Pro-am, using the Burnside and Panmure courses as well as the championship course.

== Winners ==
Year	Winner	Score	Margin of victory	Runner-up	Winner's share (£)	Ref
Carnoustie Challenge
1983	(Scotland) Ross Drummond	284	1 stroke	(Scotland) Craig Maltman	1,500	
1984	(Scotland) Russell Weir	277	1 stroke	(Scotland) Bill Lockie	1,500	
1985	(Scotland) David Huish	291	3 strokes	(Scotland) Andrew Brooks	1,500	
1986	(Scotland) Adam Hunter	283	1 stroke	(Scotland) Martin Gray	1,500	
Daily Express Scottish National Pro-am
1987	(Scotland) Lee Vannet	283	2 strokes	(Scotland) Sandy Walker	1,500	
1988	(Scotland) Gary Collinson	282	5 strokes	(Scotland) Andrew Oldcorn	1,500	
1989	(Scotland) Russell Weir	280	2 strokes	(Scotland) Craig Maltman (Scotland) Mike Miller (Scotland) David Scott	2,000	
1990	(Scotland) Mike Miller	273	2 strokes	(Scotland) Craig Maltman (Scotland) Jim White	2,500	
1991	(Scotland) Paul Lawrie	273	1 stroke	(Scotland) Craig Maltman	2,700	
1992	(Scotland) Kenny Walker	273	2 strokes	(Scotland) Gary Orr	2,700	
1993	(Scotland) Kevin Stables	281	1 stroke	(Scotland) Russell Weir	2,700	
1994	(Scotland) Alan Tait	268	11 strokes	(Scotland) Dean Robertson	3,000	
