= Jon Bevan =

English golfer (born 1967)

Personal information
- Full name: Jonathan Paul Bevan
- Nationality: England
- Born: 20 June 1967 (age 59) Lichfield, Staffordshire, England
- Height: 5 ft 11 in (1.80 m)
- Weight: 154 lb (70 kg; 11.0 st)

Career
- Sport: Golf
- Turned professional: 1995
- Former tour: European Tour
- Professional wins: 1

Best results in major championships
- Masters Tournament: DNP
- PGA Championship: DNP
- U.S. Open: DNP
- The Open Championship: T63: 2007

Jonathan Paul Bevan (born 20 June 1967) is an English professional golfer. He was captain of the victorious 2015 Great Britain and Ireland PGA Cup team.

== Professional career ==
In 2001, Bevan won the Sunderland of Scotland Masters at Irvine, finishing four strokes ahead of Colin Gillies. The event was reduced to 54 holes after the final round was abandoned because of strong winds.

Bevan is currently attached to Sandwell Park Golf Club, having previously been at Sherborne Golf Club, Rhos-on-Sea Golf Club, the Wessex Golf Centre in Weymouth, Dorset and Fynn Valley Golf Club in Ipswich.

== Professional wins (1) ==
- 2001 Sunderland of Scotland Masters

== Results in major championships ==
Tournament	1999	2000	2001	2002	2003	2004	2005	2006	2007	2008
The Open Championship	CUT							CUT	T63	CUT

Bevan only played in The Open Championship.

Did not play

CUT = missed the half-way cut
"T" = tied

== Team appearances ==
- PGA Cup (representing Great Britain and Ireland): 2007, 2009, 2015 (non-playing captain, winners)
