= Greek Seniors Open =

Tournament information
- Location: Glifada, Athens, Greece
- Established: 1999
- Course: Glyfada Golf Club
- Par: 72
- Length: 6,697 yards (6,124 m)
- Tour: European Seniors Tour
- Format: Stroke play
- Prize fund: €200,000
- Month played: September
- Final year: 2001

Tournament record score
- Aggregate: 202 Russell Weir (2001)
- To par: −14 as above

Final champion
- (Scotland) Russell Weir
- Location in Greece

The Greek Seniors Open was an over-50s men's professional golf tournament on the European Seniors Tour that was played at Glyfada Golf Club of Athens, Glifada in Athens from 1999 to 2001. The 2001 event was won by Russell Weir, his only win on the Seniors Tour.

== Winners ==
Year	Winner	Score	To par	Margin of victory	Runner(s)-up
TEMES Seniors Open
2001	(Scotland) Russell Weir	202	−14	1 stroke	(Australia) David Good
2000	(Australia) Noel Ratcliffe	211	−5	2 strokes	(England) Maurice Bembridge (Republic of Ireland) Denis O'Sullivan
Greek Seniors Open
1999	(Italy) Alberto Croce	211	−5	Playoff	(Spain) Antonio Garrido
