= Sunderland of Scotland Masters =

Tournament information
- Location: Scotland
- Established: 1985
- Format: stroke play
- Final year: 2002

The Sunderland of Scotland Masters was a golf tournament that was played from 1985 to 2002. It was a 72-hole stroke-play event on the "Tartan Tour", the PGA in Scotland's schedule. The event was initially played at Drumpellier but from 1991 a number of different Scottish venue were used.

== Winners ==
| Year | Winner | Score | Margin of victory | Runner(s)-up | Venue | Winner's share (£) | Ref |
Watsons of Airdrie Monklands Masters
| 1985 | (Scotland) David Huish | 273 | 6 strokes | (Scotland) Willie Milne | Drumpellier | 1,600 | |
| 1986 | (Scotland) Sandy Walker | 278 | 1 stroke | (Scotland) Steve Martin | Drumpellier | 1,600 | |
Sunderland Sportswear Masters
| 1987 | (Scotland) Stephen McAllister | 271 | 2 strokes | (Scotland) Martin Gray (Scotland) Craig Maltman (Scotland) Russell Weir | Drumpellier | 1,800 | |
| 1988 | (Scotland) Russell Weir | 267 | 1 stroke | (Scotland) Martin Gray | Drumpellier | 2,000 | |
| 1989 | (Scotland) Craig Maltman | 264 | 9 strokes | (Scotland) Alastair Webster | Drumpellier | 2,000 | |
| 1990 | (Scotland) Russell Weir | 269 | 2 strokes | (Scotland) Colin Gillies | Drumpellier | 3,000 | |
Sunderland of Scotland Masters
| 1991 | (Scotland) Gary Orr | 276 | 1 stroke | (Scotland) Andrew Oldcorn | Renfrew | 3,350 | |
| 1992 | (Scotland) Kenny Walker | 284 | 2 strokes | (Scotland) Gary Orr | Westerwood | 3,350 | |
| 1993 | (Scotland) Andrew Oldcorn | 273 | 6 strokes | (Scotland) Euan McIntosh | Westerwood | 3,000 | |
| 1994 | (Scotland) Russell Weir | 282 | 1 stroke | (Wales) Richard Dinsdale | Westerwood | 3,000 | |
| 1995 | (England) Michael Jones | 271 | 1 stroke | (Scotland) Steven Thompson (England) Richard Walker | Gleddoch | 3,000 | |
| 1996 | (Scotland) Craig Ronald | 271 | 2 strokes | (England) Ged Furey (Scotland) Steven Thompson | Ayr Belleisle | 3,600 | |
| 1997 | (Scotland) Lee Vannet | 271 | 2 strokes | (Scotland) Colin Gillies | Cawder | 3,600 | |
| 1998 | (Scotland) Mike Miller | 264 | Playoff | (Scotland) Robert Arnott | Cawder | | |
| 1999 | (Scotland) Colin Gillies | 270 | 1 stroke | (Scotland) Alastair Forsyth | Cawder | 3,600 | |
| 2000 | (Scotland) Steve Martin | 201 | 3 strokes | (Scotland) Brian Marchbank (Scotland) Russell Weir | Irvine | | |
| 2001 | (England) Jon Bevan | 202 | 4 strokes | (Scotland) Colin Gillies | Irvine | | |
| 2002 | (Scotland) Ross Drummond | 207 | 1 stroke | (Scotland) Ross Aitken (England) Robert Rock (Scotland) Murray Urquhart | Irvine | 3,600 | |

The first Monklands Masters was held at Drumpellier in 1984 as an 18-hole pro-am and was won by Russell Weir. The 2000, 2001 and 2002 events were reduced to 54 holes by bad weather.
