= Philips PFA Golf Classic =

Tournament information
- Location: Southampton, England
- Established: 1999
- Course: Meon Valley Country Club
- Par: 72
- Tour: European Seniors Tour
- Format: Stroke play
- Prize fund: €150,000
- Month played: May
- Final year: 1999

Tournament record score
- Aggregate: 203 Neil Coles (1998); 203 David Jones (1998)
- To par: −13 as above

Final champion
- (Australia) Bob Shearer
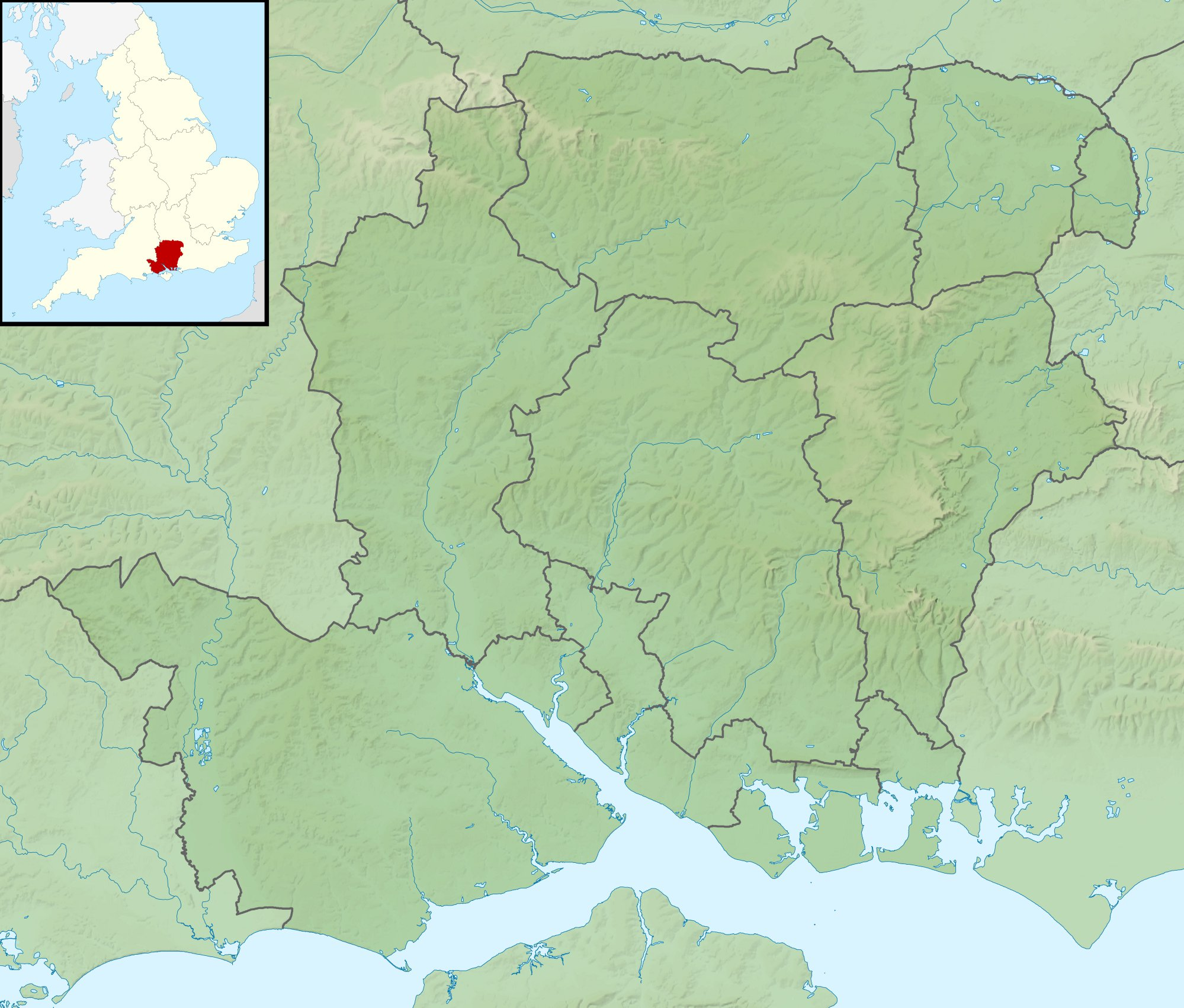
- Location in England Location in Hampshire

The Philips PFA Golf Classic was a senior (over 50s) men's professional golf tournament on the European Senior Tour. It was played from 1997 to 1999. In 1998 and 1999 the tournament was held at Meon Valley Country Club, Shedfield, Hampshire, while in 1997 it was held at St Pierre Golf & Country Club, near Chepstow, Wales

== Winners ==
Year	Winner	Score	To par	Margin of victory	Runner(s)-up	Venue	Ref.
1999	(Australia) Bob Shearer	204	−12	1 stroke	(United States) Jim Delich (Australia) Terry Gale	Meon Valley	
1998	(England) Neil Coles	203	−13	Playoff	(Northern Ireland) David Jones	Meon Valley	
1997	(United States) Deray Simon	212	−1	6 strokes	(England) Tommy Horton	St Pierre	
