= David Jones (golfer) =

Northern Irish golfer (born 1947)

Personal information
- Nationality: Northern Ireland
- Born: 22 June 1947 (age 79) Newcastle, Northern Ireland
- Height: 6 ft 5 in (1.96 m)
- Weight: 196 lb (89 kg; 14.0 st)
- Spouse: Deirdre
- Children: 4

Career
- Sport: Golf
- Turned professional: 1966
- Former tours: European Tour; European Seniors Tour
- Professional wins: 15

Number of wins by tour
- European Senior Tour: 1
- Other: 14

Best results in major championships
- Masters Tournament: DNP
- PGA Championship: DNP
- U.S. Open: DNP
- The Open Championship: T50: 1981

David Jones (born 22 June 1947) is a former European Tour golfer from Bangor, Northern Ireland. His best season was 1981, when he won the Irish PGA Championship and was joint third in the Carroll's Irish Open. He also won the 1989 Kenya Open and later played on the European Seniors Tour, winning the 1999 Jersey Seniors Open.

== Golf career ==
Jones played regularly on the European Tour from the start of the tour in 1972. He had limited success, his best finish being tied for third in the 1981 Carroll's Irish Open. Played at Portmarnock Golf Club, the event was won by Sam Torrance who finished five strokes clear of Nick Faldo with Jones and two other Irishmen, Jimmy Heggarty and Des Smyth, a further shot behind. Jones won over £4,000, enabling him to finish the 1981 season at a career high of 44 in the Order of Merit.

Jones made a number of appearances in the Open Championship between 1970 and 1990; his best finish being in 1981 where he tied for 50th place.

Jones had a number of wins in Ireland, the most important being the 1981 Irish PGA Championship at Woodbrook Golf Club. Jones score of 283 put him four shots clear of Leonard Owens and five ahead of Christy O'Connor Snr.

At the age of 41, Jones had his biggest international success, winning the Kenya Open in February 1989. Thanks to a third round of 65, Jones total of 271 put him three ahead of Mark Mouland.

After reaching 50, Jones played on the European Seniors Tour, having some success from 1997 to 2000, during which he won one event, was runner-up four times and a number of other high finishes. In his first season in 1997 he was runner-up to Tommy Horton in the Clubhaus Seniors Classic. In 1998 he lost two playoffs, to Neil Coles in the Philips PFA Golf Classic and to David Huish in the Golden Charter PGA Scottish Seniors Open. He won the 1999 Jersey Seniors Open and was runner-up in the 2000 Ordina Legends in Golf in the Netherlands, a stroke behind American John Grace. He finished 4th in the Order of Merit in 1998 and 9th the following year and represented the tour in the Praia d'El Rey European Cup in those two years.

Jones played in seven PGA Cup matches between 1976 and 1994 and was also twice captain of the Great Britain and Ireland team. He won the PGA Club Professionals Championship three times, in 1978, 1979 and 1994.

After his career on the circuit, he became a course designer and golf coach.

== Awards and honors ==
- In 1999, Jones was awarded 'Master Professional' status by the Professional Golfers Association.
- In 2018, Jones earned Honorary Membership of the Association.

== Professional wins (15) ==
=== Safari Circuit wins (1) ===
No.	Date	Tournament	Winning score	Margin of victory	Runner-up
1	12 Feb 1989	555 Kenya Open	−13 (69-69-65-68=271)	3 strokes	(Wales) Mark Mouland

=== Other wins (13) ===
- 1975 Ulster Professional Championship
- 1978 Slazenger PGA Club Professionals' Championship, Irish Dunlop Tournament
- 1979 Slazenger PGA Club Professionals' Championship, Irish Dunlop Tournament, Carroll's Irish Match Play Championship
- 1981 Irish PGA Championship, Port Harcourt Open
- 1982 Irish Masters
- 1985 Ulster Professional Championship
- 1993 Ulster Professional Championship
- 1994 Glenmuir Club Professional Championship
- 1999 Irish PGA Seniors

=== European Seniors Tour wins (1) ===
No.	Date	Tournament	Winning score	Margin of victory	Runners-up
1	13 Jun 1999	Jersey Seniors Open	−8 (69-70-69=208)	2 strokes	(Northern Ireland) Paul Leonard, (England) Jim Rhodes

European Seniors Tour playoff record (0–2)

No.	Year	Tournament	Opponent	Result
1	1998	Philips PFA Golf Classic	(England) Neil Coles	Lost to birdie on first extra hole
2	1998	Golden Charter PGA Scottish Seniors Open	(Scotland) David Huish	Lost to par on second extra hole

== Results in major championships ==
Tournament	1974	1975	1976	1977	1978	1979
The Open Championship	CUT	CUT	CUT	T58	CUT	CUT

Tournament	1980	1981	1982	1983	1984	1985	1986	1987	1988	1989
The Open Championship	CUT	T50					T72	77	CUT	

Tournament	1990
The Open Championship	CUT

Note: Jones only played in The Open Championship.

Did not play

CUT = missed the half-way cut
"T" indicates a tie for a place

== Team appearances ==
- PGA Cup (representing Great Britain and Ireland/Europe): 1976, 1977 (tie), 1978 (winners), 1979 (winners), 1981 (tie), 1982 (non-playing captain), 1992, 1994, 2003 (non-playing captain)
- Europcar Cup (representing Ireland): 1988
- Praia d'El Rey European Cup: 1998 (tie), 1999
