= Foxhills Golf Club =

Golf resort in Ottershaw, Surrey, England

Coordinates: 51.37379°N 0.55346°W

Foxhills is a golf club and resort located in Ottershaw, Surrey, United Kingdom. It was established in 1975 and named for Charles James Fox on whose former estate it's located.

== History ==
Foxhills is credited with helping launch the career of Ryder Cup player Paul Casey through the Foxhills Foundation junior golf programme. As of 2019, it was one of only two venues to twice serve as host green to the PGA Tour, the first time in 2017 and the second in 2021.

=== 2012 Olympics ===
During the 2012 Summer Olympics, the GB cycling team stayed at the hotel. The hotel had been chosen 15 months prior to the 2012 Olympics, and the hotel lavished £60,000 on cycling equipment, such as installing Wattbikes.
