= Welsh Golf Classic =

Coral Classic
Tournament information
- Location: Porthcawl, Wales
- Established: 1979
- Course: Royal Porthcawl
- Par: 72
- Tour: European Tour
- Format: Stroke play
- Prize fund: £50,000
- Month played: June
- Final year: 1982

Tournament record score
- Aggregate: 273 Gordon Brand Jnr (1982)
- To par: −15 as above

Final champion
- (Scotland) Gordon Brand Jnr
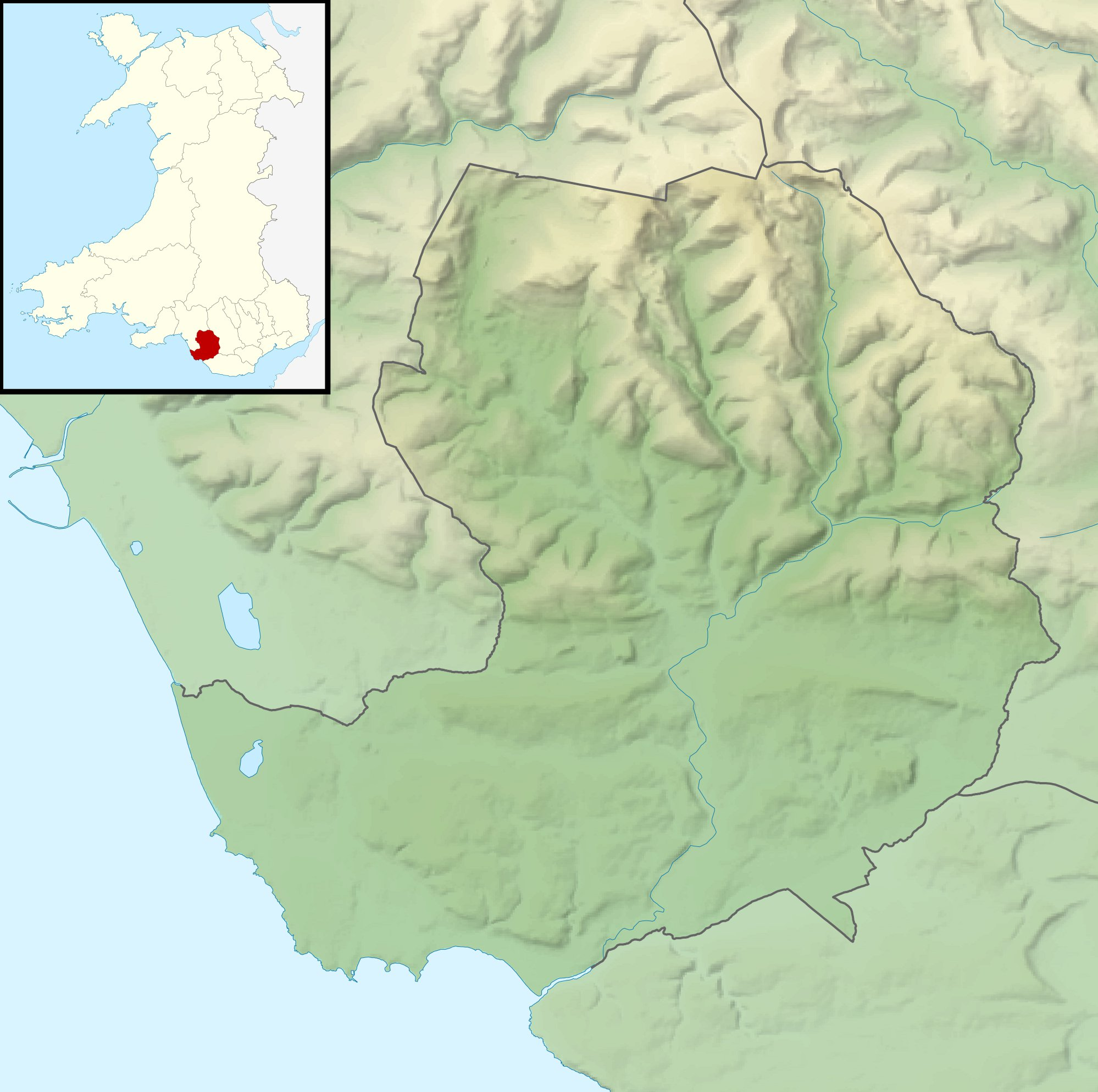
- Location in Wales Location in Bridgend

The Welsh Golf Classic was a men's professional golf tournament on the European Tour, that was held annually in Wales from 1979 to 1982. The inaugural event was held at Wenvoe Castle Golf Club near Cardiff, with the other three stagings taking place at Royal Porthcawl Golf Club in Mid Glamorgan.

The most notable winner was future two-time major championship winner Sandy Lyle.

In its final year, the prize fund was £50,000, which was one of the smaller purses on the tour that year.

== Winners ==
Year	Winner	Score	To par	Margin of victory	Runner(s)-up	Winner's share (£)	Venue
Coral Classic
1982	(Scotland) Gordon Brand Jnr	273	−15	3 strokes	(Australia) Greg Norman	8,330	Royal Porthcawl
1981	(Republic of Ireland) Des Smyth	282	−6	2 strokes	(England) Michael King (West Germany) Bernhard Langer (Republic of Ireland) John O'Leary	7,000	Royal Porthcawl
Coral Welsh Classic
1980	(Scotland) Sandy Lyle	277	−11	5 strokes	(England) Martin Foster	5,830	Royal Porthcawl
Welsh Golf Classic
1979	(England) Mark James	278	−6	Playoff	(Scotland) Mike Miller (Northern Ireland) Eddie Polland	5,000	Wenvoe Castle
