= Royal Porthcawl Golf Club =

Golf club in Wales, United Kingdom

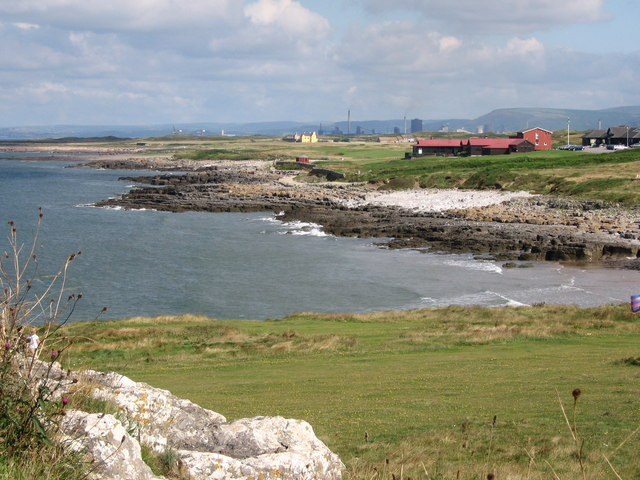
- Royal Porthcawl in 2008

- Location within the United Kingdom Location within Wales
- 51.492°N 3.726°W

Club information
- Location: Porthcawl, Wales, U.K.
- Established: 1895 (1891)
- Type: Private
- Total holes: 18
- Tournaments: Senior Open (2014, 2017, 2023); The Amateur (7 times); Walker Cup (1995); Curtis Cup (1964); British Masters (1961); Welsh Golf Classic; University Golf Match
- Website: royalporthcawl.com
- Par: 72 (71 on 3 Senior Opens)
- Length: 7,137 yards (6,526 m)
- Course rating: 76.4

Royal Porthcawl Golf Club is a golf club in Wales in the United Kingdom, located north of Porthcawl and bordering the Bristol Channel.

The club has hosted many prestigious tournaments including The Amateur Championship on six occasions, the Walker Cup in 1995, the Curtis Cup in 1964, the British Masters in 1961, and European Tour event, the Welsh Golf Classic in the early 1980s. In March 2010, it hosted the University Golf Match between Oxford and Cambridge universities, with Oxford winning 9–6. The Senior Open Championship has been played here three times, in 2014, 2017, and 2023.

== History ==
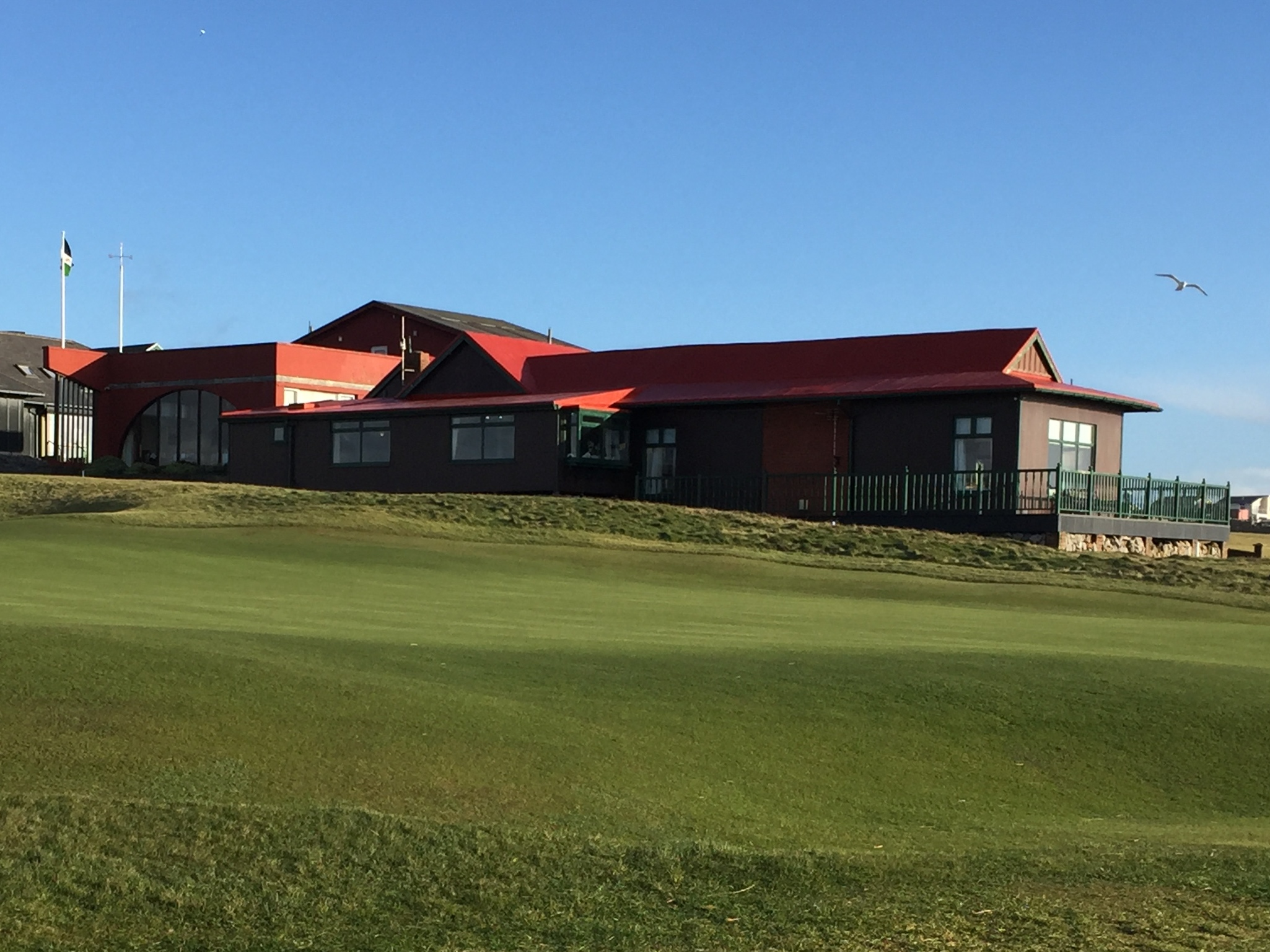
Royal Porthcawl Clubhouse

The club was founded in 1891 by a group of businessmen from Cardiff, with the first nine-hole golf course being laid out on Lock's Common by Charles Gibson the following year. In 1895, the club moved to its present location with the addition of a further nine-hole course. Shortly after that, the new course was extended to eighteen holes, with the original course later being abandoned. Royal status was conferred on the club by Edward VII in 1909.

The Senior Open Championship was played at Royal Porthcawl in 2014 and Bernhard Langer won by thirteen strokes over runner-up Colin Montgomerie; it returned again in 2017, where Langer defeated Corey Pavin to win again.

In 2015, The R&A championship committee chairman Peter Unsworth said that The R&A had "no intention" of hosting The Open Championship at Royal Porthcawl. He added that "We're happy with the number of courses on the rota, and we don't have any intention to go to Porthcawl". It is thought that the infrastructure around Royal Porthcawl does not meet requirements, with roads leading to the course being narrow and that public transport would not cope with the huge crowds in the Open Championships.

== Major tournaments hosted at Royal Porthcawl ==
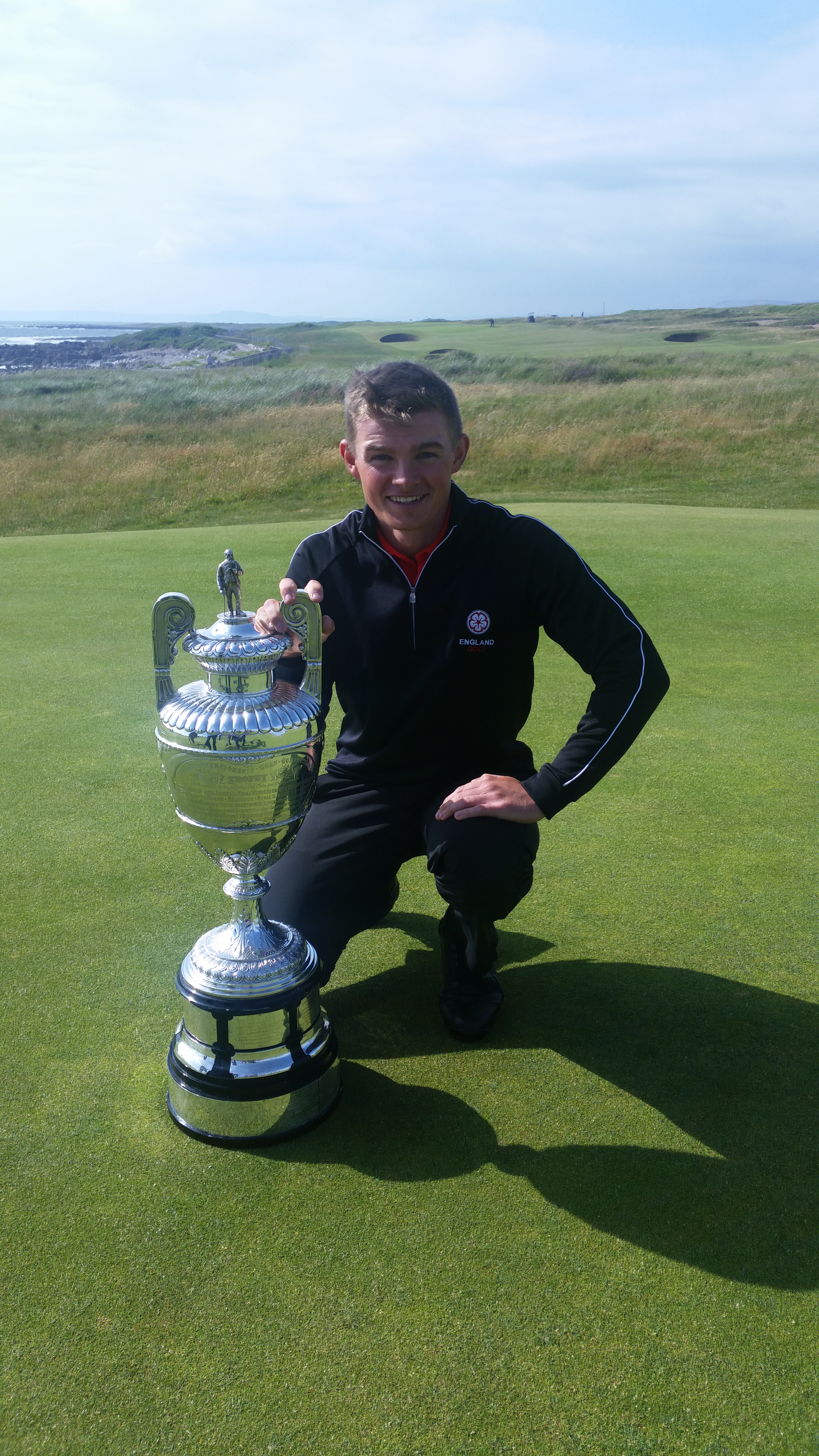
Scott Gregory was the winner of The Amateur Championship in 2016 at Royal Porthcawl.

Year	Tournament	Winner
1951	The Amateur Championship	(United States) Dick Chapman
1961	British Masters	(Australia) Peter Thomson
1964	Curtis Cup	United States
1965	The Amateur Championship	(England) Michael Bonallack
1973	The Amateur Championship	(United States) Dick Siderowf
1980	The Amateur Championship	(Wales) Duncan Evans
1988	The Amateur Championship	(Sweden) Cristian Härdin
1995	Walker Cup	Great Britain & Ireland
2002	The Amateur Championship	(Spain) Alejandro Larrazábal
2014	Senior Open Championship	(Germany) Bernhard Langer
2016	The Amateur Championship	(England) Scott Gregory
2017	Senior Open Championship	(Germany) Bernhard Langer
2023	Senior Open Championship	(Germany) Alex Čejka
2025	AIG Women's Open	(Japan) Miyū Yamashita

== Scorecard ==
Tee	Rating/Slope	1	2	3	4	5	6	7	8	9	Out	10	11	12	13	14	15	16	17	18	In	Total
Black	M:75.7 / 143 W:83.3 / 154	374	464	452	216	611	394	122	474	402	3,509	360	184	582	475	173	476	430	504	459	3,643	7,152
Par	Men's Women's	4 4	4 5	4 5	3 3	5 6	4 4	3 3	5 5	4 5	36 40	4 4	3 3	5 5	4 5	3 3	4 5	4 5	5 5	4 5	36 40	72 80
Blue	M:75.0 / 141 W:82.3 / 152	374	464	445	216	556	394	122	474	402	3,447	360	184	565	435	163	451	430	504	427	3,519	6,966
Par	Men's Women's	4 4	4 5	4 5	3 3	5 5	4 4	3 3	5 5	4 5	35 39	4 4	3 3	5 5	4 5	3 3	4 5	4 5	5 5	4 5	36 40	72 79
White	M:73.2 / 137 W:80.0 / 148	353	425	388	200	486	387	119	472	377	3,207	333	180	549	421	150	422	426	493	410	3,384	6,591
Par	Men's Women's	4 4	4 5	4 4	3 3	5 5	4 4	3 3	5 5	4 4	36 37	4 4	3 3	5 5	4 5	3 3	4 5	4 5	5 5	4 5	36 40	72 77
Yellow	M:71.8 / 133 W:78.5 / 145	316	410	376	180	473	378	116	439	368	3,056	323	158	529	410	146	411	422	488	371	3,258	6,314
Par	Men's Women's	4 4	4 4	4 4	3 3	5 5	4 4	3 3	5 5	4 4	36 36	4 4	3 3	5 5	4 4	3 3	4 4	4 5	5 5	4 4	36 37	72 73
Red	M:69.5 / 124 W:75.9 / 139	310	373	336	153	432	358	113	420	320	2,815	320	143	503	360	143	384	392	449	334	3,028	5,843
Par	Men's Women's	4 4	4 5	4 4	3 3	5 5	4 4	3 3	4 5	4 4	35 37	4 4	3 3	5 5	4 4	3 3	4 5	4 5	5 5	4 4	36 38	71 75
Bronze	M:67.8 / 116 W:73.8 / 134	230	313	336	143	432	358	113	420	227	2,572	301	143	437	360	143	291	344	449	344	2,802	5,374
Par	Men's Women's	4 4	4 4	4 4	3 3	5 5	4 4	3 3	4 5	4 4	35 36	4 4	3 3	5 5	4 4	3 3	4 4	4 5	5 5	4 4	36 37	71 73

== See also ==
- List of golf clubs granted Royal status
