= Scott Henderson (golfer) =

Scottish golfer

Personal information
- Full name: Scott Henderson
- Nationality: Scotland
- Born: 10 September 1969 (age 57) Aberdeen, Scotland
- Height: 6 ft 2 in (1.88 m)

Career
- Sport: Golf
- Turned professional: 1992
- Former tours: European Tour; Challenge Tour
- Professional wins: 3

Best results in major championships
- Masters Tournament: DNP
- PGA Championship: DNP
- U.S. Open: DNP
- The Open Championship: T69: 2001

Achievements and awards
- Sir Henry Cotton Rookie of the Year: 1997

Scott Henderson (born 10 September 1969) is a Scottish professional golfer.

== Career ==
In 1969, Henderson was born in Aberdeen, Scotland. He worked as an engineer in the oil industry.

In 1992, Henderson turned professional. In 1996, Henderson had success at the European Tour qualifying school earning rights to play on tour. In 1997, Henderson was named as the Sir Henry Cotton Rookie of the Year in 1997. He also finished inside the top 100 on the European Tour Order of Merit the following season but lost his card at the end of 1999.

Henderson has failed on many occasions to regain his playing privileges via qualifying school except for two seasons on the second-tier Challenge Tour. He has relied mainly on invitations since then.

== Awards and honors ==
In 1997, Henderson won the European Tour's Sir Henry Cotton Rookie of the Year honors.

== Professional wins (3) ==
=== Tartan Tour wins (1) ===
- 2008 Carnegie Invitational

=== Other wins (2) ===
- 1994 Scottish Assistants' Championship
- 1996 Northern Open

== Results in major championships ==
Tournament	1998	1999	2000	2001	2002
The Open Championship	CUT			T69	CUT

Note: Henderson only played in The Open Championship.

Did not play

CUT = missed the half-way cut
"T" = tied

== Team appearances ==
- PGA Cup (representing Great Britain and Ireland): 2013
