= Ross Drummond =

Scottish professional golfer (born 1956)

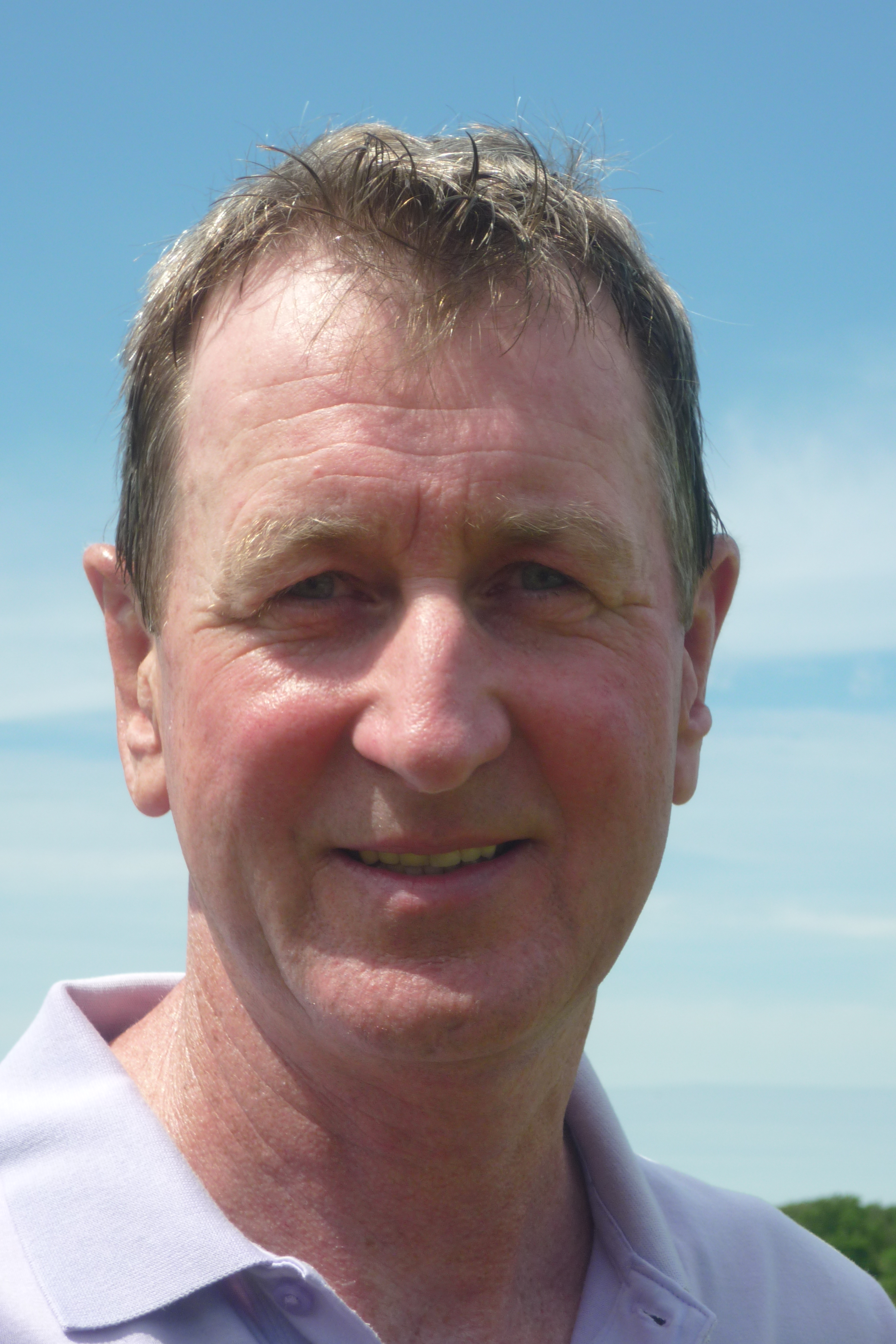

Personal information
- Full name: Ross Drummond
- Nationality: Scotland
- Born: 29 November 1956 (age 69) Paisley, Scotland
- Height: 6 ft 4 in (1.93 m)
- Spouse: Claire (married 1981)
- Children: Lauren (1999)

Career
- Sport: Golf
- Turned professional: 1975
- Current tours: European Senior Tour; Champions Tour
- Former tour: European Tour
- Professional wins: 9

Best results in major championships
- Masters Tournament: DNP
- PGA Championship: DNP
- U.S. Open: DNP
- The Open Championship: T31: 1984, 1995

Ross Drummond (born 29 November 1956) is a Scottish professional golfer from Paisley whose most successful year on the PGA European Tour was chronicled by The Guardian's golf correspondent, Lawrence Donegan, in the book Four Iron in the Soul. Drummond did not win a tournament on the European Tour despite a long career, although he did finish as a runner-up at the 1996 Slaley Hall Northumberland Challenge. Having retired from the European Tour at the end of 2004, Drummond now plays regularly on the European Senior Tour.

== Career ==
Drummond played for 24 years on the PGA European Tour and has frequently been described as a "journeyman" professional. Since 2007, he has been playing on the European Senior Tour.

=== European Tour ===
Drummond turned pro in 1975. He won the Tooting Bec Cup for the lowest single-round score posted by a British or Irish player at the 1987 Open Championship at Muirfield, carding a 66 in his second round. In 1996, he finished runner-up to Retief Goosen in the inaugural Slaley Hall Northumberland Challenge and third behind Jesper Parnevik and Colin Montgomerie at the Trophée Lancôme, and finished in 42nd place on that year's European Tour Order of Merit. Drummond's 1996 season, which proved to be his most successful on the European Tour, was the subject of the book Four Iron in the Soul, written by The Guardian's golf correspondent, Lawrence Donegan, who caddied for him that year. According to Donegan, Drummond was the first player on the tour to employ the services of sports psychologist Jos Vanstiphout. Donegan had first met Drummond while researching an article on journeymen professionals, and writes in his book that this is "a description that might have been invented for him", noting that "I don't mean that derisively".

Despite his success in 1996, Drummond subsequently lost his card in 1997, ending a 20-year run on the tour. After failing to regain his tour card at the 1997 European Tour Qualifying School, he was medalist at the Qualifying School in 1998 but never managed to re-establish himself on the European Tour, having unsuccessfully participated in the Qualifying School in 1999 and 2000.

Reflecting on his career at the Senior PGA Championship in May 2009, he stated: "I would say that I've just squeaked by. I've never been supported by sponsors. In the mid-1980s I had a sponsorship for a couple of years but it really wasn't a lot of money. I've never had any endorsements that paid big money. And, I basically funded [my career] myself". By 2000, he was describing himself as "semi-retired" because he only had a small number of invitations to play in European PGA events, though he won the Tartan Tour Order of Merit that season and came tied second in the Madeira Island Open. He played his last tournaments on the European Tour in 2004.

=== European Senior Tour ===
In February 2007, Drummond played his first tournament on the European Senior Tour at the DGM Barbados Open at Royal Westmoreland, finishing joint 6th. He finished as runner-up in two events in 2007, at the Ryder Cup Wales Seniors Open and the Charles Church Scottish Seniors Open, coming 6th in the overall rankings for the year and winning total prize money of €172,002.

Drummond subsequently stated that he felt he had the ability to win a tournament on the 2008 circuit. His best result of the season was tied second place at the Jersey Seniors Classic in June. In 2008, he won prize money amounting to €106,343 and was ranked 17th. In 2009, Drummond's best finishes were tied third at the Ryder Cup Wales Seniors Open and third outright at the Benahavis Senior Masters. He won a total of €97,920, finishing 11th on the tour. He had led the Senior PGA Championship by two strokes after two rounds, but ended up finishing tied 37th. In 2010, he finished 16th on the tour, with winnings of €122,013; his best result of the year was second in the Handa Irish Senior Open.

== Professional wins (9) ==
- 1980 Scottish Coca-Cola Tournament
- 1983 Skol Tournament, Carnoustie Challenge
- 1986 Scottish Professional Championship
- 1987 Scottish Professional Championship
- 1989 Scottish Professional Championship
- 1990 Scottish Professional Championship
- 2002 Sunderland of Scotland Masters
- 2005 Scottish Matchplay Championship

== Playoff record ==
European Senior Tour playoff record (0–1)

No.	Year	Tournament	Opponent	Result
1	2015	Travis Perkins Masters	(Scotland) Colin Montgomerie	Lost to birdie on second extra hole

== Results in major championships ==
Tournament	1980	1981	1982	1983	1984	1985	1986	1987	1988	1989
The Open Championship	CUT	CUT		CUT	T31		T72	T35		

Tournament	1990	1991	1992	1993	1994	1995	1996	1997	1998
The Open Championship	CUT			T63		T31	CUT		CUT

Note: Drummond only played in The Open Championship.

Did not play

CUT = missed the half-way cut (3rd round cut in 1981 Open Championship)
"T" = tied

== Team appearances ==
- Europcar Cup (representing Scotland): 1988
