= Jos Vanstiphout =

Belgian sports psychologist

Jos Vanstiphout (1951–2013) was a Belgian sports psychologist who was specialized in golf. Despite having no professional training as a psychologist, he has worked with notable clients, including Ernie Els, Thomas Levet, Retief Goosen, Michael Campbell, Pádraig Harrington, Barry Lane, Sergio García and Søren Hansen. He was a member of IMG.

== Early life ==
Vanstiphout was born in Houthalen and grew up in Antwerp. He left school when he was 14 years old and took on a number of odd jobs. He formed the band The Mayfair Set which was the Belgian selection for the World Popular Song Festival, but their only album failed to gain further popularity.

== Career ==
Vanstiphout started working as a newspaper ad salesman, and got interested in psychology. His main interests were Edward de Bono and sports guru Timothy Gallwey, author of The Inner Game of... series. After he met Gallwey, he developed his own similar ideas. He then followed the PGA European Tour for three years before signing a contract with his first client, either Ross Drummond or Rolf Muntz. He started working with Retief Goosen in 1999 when he was ranked number 83 in the world, and helped bring him to world ranking number 4 and a win at the 2001 U.S. Open Golf Championship. This brought him to the attention of many other top golfers. Goosen publicly acknowledged the work of Vanstiphout in helping him win the 2001 Championship.

Over the next few years, Vanstiphout became the sport psychologist for a number of the top professional golf players, including Ernie Els and Retief Goosen. As of 2009, he worked with a.o. Ernie Els, Paul McGinley, Darren Clarke, Michael Campbell and David Howell. He also has worked with a few other sportspeople, including cricketer Andrew Flintoff. Jos died in December 2013.

=== Clients ===
- Aaron Baddeley
- Rich Beem
- Thomas Bjørn
- Ángel Cabrera
- Michael Campbell
- Darren Clarke
- Ross Drummond
- Ernie Els
- Gary Evans
- Andrew Flintoff
- Sergio García
- Retief Goosen
- Søren Hansen
- Pádraig Harrington
- Grégory Havret
- David Howell
- Raphaël Jacquelin
- Maarten Lafeber
- Barry Lane
- Thomas Levet
- Carl Mason
- Paul McGinley
- Mark McNulty
- Rolf Muntz
- Gary Murphy
- Eduardo Romero
- Justin Rose
- Adam Scott
- Marcel Siem
- Vijay Singh
