= PGA Professional Championship (Great Britain and Ireland) =

Tournament information
- Established: 1973
- Organised by: The PGA
- Format: stroke play

Current champion
- (England) Paul Hendriksen (2023)

The PGA Professional Championship is a golf tournament run by The PGA for club professionals. It was first played in 1973 as the MacGregor PGA Club Professionals' Championship. The leading nine players in the event became the Great Britain and Ireland team for the first Diamondhead Cup, the forerunner of the PGA Cup, played against a United States team at Pinehurst later in the year.

== Winners ==
Year	Winner	Score	Margin of victory	Runner(s)-up	Winner's share (£)	Venue	Ref.
PGA Professional Championship
2023	(England) Paul Hendriksen	273	6 strokes	(England) Matthew Cort	10,000	Sherwood Forest	
2022	(England) Matthew Cort	282	Playoff	(England) Daniel Whitby-Smith	10,000	Slaley Hall	
2021	(Scotland) Paul O'Hara	268	4 strokes	(Scotland) Greig Hutcheon	10,000	Blairgowrie	
2020	(England) Matt Ford	269	7 strokes	(England) Matthew Cort (England) Jordan Godwin	10,000	Trentham	
Titleist & FootJoy PGA Professional Championship
2019	(Scotland) Alastair Forsyth	263	11 strokes	(England) Richard Wallis	10,000	Hunstanton	
2018	(England) Andrew Willey	272	1 stroke	(Scotland) Paul O'Hara	10,000	Little Aston	
2017	(Scotland) Paul O'Hara	285	1 stroke	(Scotland) Christopher Currie	10,000	Luttrellstown Castle	
2016	(Republic of Ireland) David Higgins	273	3 strokes	(England) Andrew Raitt	10,000	The Oxfordshire	
2015	(England) Paul Hendriksen	288	1 stroke	(Northern Ireland) Cameron Clark (Wales) Gareth Wright	10,000	Burnham & Berrow	
Glenmuir PGA Professional Championship
2014	(England) Christopher McDonnell	277	1 stroke	(England) Jason Levermore	10,000	Blairgowrie	
2013	(England) Daniel Greenwood	280	9 strokes	(England) David Callaway	10,000	Slaley Hall	
2012	(Wales) Gareth Wright	271	4 strokes	(England) Craig Shave	10,000	Carden Park	
2011	(England) Craig Goodfellow	281	3 strokes	(England) Robert Giles	10,000	The Belfry	
2010	(Republic of Ireland) David Mortimer	279	Playoff	(England) David Shacklady	10,000	The Oxfordshire	
2009	(Wales) James Lee	291	4 strokes	(England) Jamie Harris	10,000	Dundonald Links	
2008	(England) Paul Simpson	283	Playoff	(Wales) Andrew Barnett	10,000	Moortown	
Glenmuir Club Professional Championship
2007	(Republic of Ireland) John Dwyer	282	Playoff	(Wales) Andrew Barnett	10,000	Royal Porthcawl	
2006	(England) Paul Wesselingh	279	Playoff	(England) Duncan Muscroft	10,000	Prince's	
2005	(Wales) Matthew Ellis	285	Playoff	(England) Mark Reynolds (England) Darren Parris (England) Paul Wesselingh	10,000	Woodhall Spa	
2004	(England) Tony Nash	270	2 strokes	(Scotland) Kenny Walker (England) Sean Whiffin (England) Andrew Willey	10,000	Southport & Ainsdale	
2003	(Scotland) Gordon Law	280	4 strokes	(Scotland) Scott Henderson	10,000	St Andrews Bay	
2002	(Scotland) Bob Cameron	280	1 stroke	(Republic of Ireland) John Dwyer	10,000	Saunton	
2001	(Wales) Simon Edwards	275	3 strokes	(Scotland) Bob Cameron	9,250	County Louth	
2000	(Scotland) Bob Cameron	295	Playoff	(Scotland) Russell Weir	9,250	Duke's course, St Andrews	
1999	(Wales) Sion Bebb	283	Playoff	(England) Chris Hall (England) Paul Wesselingh	9,250	King's Lynn	
1998	(England) Michael Jones	280	1 stroke	(Wales) Michael Macara (England) Paul Simpson	9,250	Royal St David's	
1997	(England) Brian Rimmer	268	8 strokes	(England) Paul Wesselingh	9,250	Northop	
1996	(Scotland) Bill Longmuir	280	3 strokes	(Scotland) Gordon Law	9,000	County Louth	
1995	(England) Paul Carman	269	2 strokes	(Scotland) Colin Gillies (England) Joe Higgins (England) Nick Job (England) Robin Mann	8,000	West Hill	
1994	(Northern Ireland) David Jones	278	2 strokes	(England) Nick Job (England) Robin Mann (England) Hogan Stott	7,000	North Berwick	
1993	(England) Chris Hall	274	3 strokes	(England) Mark Parker (Scotland) Russell Weir	5,640	Coventry	
Wilson Club Professionals' Championship
1992	(England) John Hoskison	275	6 strokes	(England) Chris Hall	6,000	St Pierre	
1991	(Scotland) Bill McColl	286	2 strokes	(Scotland) Kevin Stables	(5,250)	King's Lynn	
1990	(Scotland) Alastair Webster	292	2 strokes	(Scotland) Kevin Stables (Scotland) Russell Weir	4,750	Carnoustie	
1989	(Scotland) Brian Barnes	280	4 strokes	(Scotland) David Scott (England) Gary Stafford	4,000	Prince's	
1988	(Scotland) Russell Weir	269	8 strokes	(England) Ged Furey	3,600	Royal St David's	
1987	(Scotland) Russell Weir	273	2 strokes	(England) John Hoskison (Scotland) David Huish	3,200	Sandiway	
1986	(Scotland) David Huish	278	5 strokes	(Scotland) Martin Gray	3,000	Royal Birkdale	
1985	(England) Robin Mann	291	5 strokes	(England) Peter Allan (England) David Thorp	3,000	The Belfry	
1984	(England) Denis Durnian	278	4 strokes	(Scotland) John Chillas	3,000	Bolton Old Links	
GMC Club Professionals' Championship
1983	(Scotland) Jim Farmer	285	1 stroke	(Scotland) Alistair Thomson (England) Phil Weaver	2,500	Heaton Park	
PGA Club Professionals' Championship
1982	(England) Denis Durnian	270	1 stroke	(Scotland) John Chillas	1,500	Hill Valley	
Dunhill PGA Club Professionals' Championship
1981	(England) Mike Steadman	289	1 stroke	(Wales) Craig Defoy (England) Denis Durnian (Northern Ireland) David Jones	3,000	Woburn	
Slazenger PGA Club Professionals' Championship
1980	(England) David Jagger	286	Playoff	(Scotland) David Huish	2,000	Turnberry	
1979	(Northern Ireland) David Jones	278	3 strokes	(England) Mike Steadman	2,000	Pannal	
1978	(Northern Ireland) David Jones	281	1 stroke	(England) Brian Waites	2,000	Pannal	
1977	(Scotland) David Huish	284	4 strokes	(England) Mike Ingham (Scotland) Jim Farmer	2,000	Notts	
Rank Xerox – Slazenger PGA Club Professionals' Championship
1976	(England) Bill Ferguson	283	2 strokes	(England) Brian Waites	2,000	Moortown	
MacGregor PGA Club Professionals' Championship
1975	(England) Doug Sewell	276	2 strokes	(Scotland) David Huish	750	Calcot Park	
1974	(Scotland) Bill Murray	274	3 strokes	(Northern Ireland) Vince Hood	750	Calcot Park	
1973	(England) Doug Sewell	276	1 stroke	(Scotland) David Melville	750	Calcot Park	

The 1991 event was won by Brett Upper, an American, with a score of 285. Upper received the first prize money but was not eligible to win the title.
