= David Huish =

Scottish golfer

Personal information
- Full name: David Huish
- Nationality: Scotland
- Born: 23 April 1944 (age 82) North Berwick, Scotland
- Height: 6 ft 3 in (1.91 m)

Career
- Sport: Golf
- Turned professional: 1959
- Former tours: European Tour; European Seniors Tour
- Professional wins: 20

Number of wins by tour
- European Senior Tour: 5
- Other: 15

Best results in major championships
- Masters Tournament: DNP
- PGA Championship: DNP
- U.S. Open: DNP
- The Open Championship: T21: 1976

David Huish (born 23 April 1944) is a Scottish professional golfer. Perhaps best known for being the halfway leader of 1975 Open Championship.

== Career ==
In 1944, Huish (pronounced "hush") was born in North Berwick, Scotland.

In 1959, Huish turned professional with his first job being as an assistant at Gullane, Scotland. In 1965, he took up his first head professional position at Hamilton Golf Club, soon after winning the Scottish Assistants' Championship at Longniddry. Two years later he returned to his home town to take up the same role at North Berwick Golf Club, where he remained until his retirement in 2009. He was succeeded by his son, Martyn.

Huish qualified for the 1968 Open Championship at Carnoustie and finished tied for 31st place. He also qualified in 1969 at Royal Lytham where he made the second-round cut but missed the second cut after three rounds. In 1970 he lost in a playoff for the Scottish Professional Championship at Montrose. Huish was tied with Ronnie Shade and David Webster after the 72 holes. In the 18-hole playoff the following day Shade and Webster scored 70 with Huish scoring 73. Shade won at the next hole in a sudden-death playoff with Webster. In 1971 Huish was a runner-up in the Agfa-Gevaert Tournament at Stoke Poges, an event on the British PGA Circuit. He finished two strokes behind Peter Oosterhuis and tied with Brian Barnes. The following month he won the Scottish Uniroyal Tournament at East Kilbride, four strokes ahead of John Garner.

As a club professional, Huish never followed a full-time tournament career. Although he was regarded as a competent tournament player, it was not until the 1975 Open Championship that he came to the attention of a wider audience. After qualifying for the championship in a seven-man play-off, he shot rounds of 67 and 69 at Carnoustie to lead by two strokes over Tom Watson, Peter Oosterhuis, and Bernard Gallacher at the halfway mark. However, he fell away over the weekend and ultimately finished 13 shots off the pace, in a tie for 32nd place. His best finish in the Open came the following year at Birkdale, when he tied for 21st place.

While Huish never won a top flight tour event, he did win many other tournaments. After turning 50, he joined the European Seniors Tour, where he enjoyed some success, claiming five victories, four of them in play-offs, with the last coming in 2001 when he won, again in a play-off, at the Bad Ragaz PGA Seniors Open in Switzerland.

Huish later served as the PGA Captain, a PGA Board Member and Ryder Cup Committee Member, a position he held longer than anyone else. In 2004, Huish received the Special Award at the Seniors Tour annual awards dinner for services to golf.

== Personal life ==
Huish also has two children from a previous marriage. In 1989, he married his second wife Diane and they have a son.

== Professional wins (20) ==
=== Regular career wins (15) ===
- 1965 Scottish Assistants' Championship
- 1971 Scottish Uniroyal Tournament
- 1973 Northern Open
- 1975 Scottish Professional Championship
- 1977 Slazenger PGA Club Professionals' Championship
- 1980 Northern Open
- 1983 Scottish Brewers Round-robin Tournament
- 1984 Northern Open
- 1985 Watsons of Airdrie Monklands Masters, Scottish Coca-Cola Tournament, Carnoustie Challenge
- 1986 Wilson Club Professionals' Championship
- 1987 Scottish Coca-Cola Tournament
- 1988 Northern Open
- 1989 Scottish Coca-Cola Tournament

=== European Seniors Tour wins (5) ===
No.	Date	Tournament	Winning score	Margin of victory	Runner(s)-up
1	30 Jun 1996	Ryder Collingtree Seniors Classic	+3 (73-73-73=219)	Playoff	(England) Malcolm Gregson, (Australia) Noel Ratcliffe
2	6 Sep 1998	Golden Charter PGA Scottish Seniors Open	−15 (70-65-70-68=208)	Playoff	(Northern Ireland) David Jones
3	24 Jun 2000	Lawrence Batley Seniors	−1 (71-72-69=212)	Playoff	(England) Neil Coles, (South Africa) John Fourie
4	13 Aug 2000	Bad Ragaz PGA Seniors Open	−12 (73-62-65=200)	4 strokes	(England) Jim Rhodes
5	12 Aug 2001	Bad Ragaz PGA Seniors Open (2)	−12 (70-64-64=198)	Playoff	(Australia) David Good

European Seniors Tour playoff record (4–0)

No.	Year	Tournament	Opponent(s)	Result
1	1996	Ryder Collingtree Seniors Classic	(England) Malcolm Gregson, (Australia) Noel Ratcliffe	Won with par on first extra hole
2	1998	Golden Charter PGA Scottish Seniors Open	(Northern Ireland) David Jones	Won with par on second extra hole
3	2000	Lawrence Batley Seniors	(England) Neil Coles, (South Africa) John Fourie	Won with par on first extra hole
4	2001	Bad Ragaz PGA Seniors Open	(Australia) David Good	Won with birdie on first extra hole

== Results in major championships ==
Tournament	1968	1969	1970	1971	1972	1973	1974	1975	1976	1977
The Open Championship	T31	CUT			CUT	T56		T32	T21	CUT

Note: Huish only played in The Open Championship.

Did not play

CUT = missed the half-way cut (3rd round cut in 1969 Open Championship)
"T" = tied

== Team appearances ==
- World Cup (representing Scotland): 1973
- Double Diamond International (representing Scotland): 1975, 1976
- PGA Cup/Diamondhead Cup (representing Great Britain and Ireland): 1974, 1975, 1977 (tie), 1978 (winners), 1979 (winners), 1980, 1984 (winners), 1986

== See also ==
- List of golfers with most European Senior Tour wins
