= David Jagger (golfer) =

English golfer (born 1949)

Personal information
- Full name: David Jagger
- Nationality: England
- Born: 9 June 1949 (age 77) Sheffield, England
- Height: 6 ft 2 in (1.88 m)
- Weight: 182 lb (83 kg; 13.0 st)

Career
- Sport: Golf
- Turned professional: 1966
- Former tour: European Tour
- Professional wins: 12

Best results in major championships
- Masters Tournament: DNP
- PGA Championship: DNP
- U.S. Open: DNP
- The Open Championship: T28: 1974

David Jagger (born 9 June 1949) is an English professional golfer.

== Career ==
Jagger was born in Sheffield. He played on the European Tour for many years, where he was renowned as a joker, but had most of his success playing on the Safari Circuit in Africa during the European winters in the 1970s and 1980s. He won several tournaments on that circuit, including the Nigerian Open three times, and topped the money list in 1982. He also recorded a round of 59 during the pro-am prior to the 1973 Nigerian Open. His best placing on the European Order of Merit was 26th in 1976.

Jagger played in several Open Championships, making the final round on four occasions with a best finish of tied for 28th place behind Gary Player at Royal Lytham in 1974. In addition to playing tournament golf, he also worked as a club professional at Selby Golf Club between 1978 and 1988. Since 1988 he has been at Hull Golf Club.

== Professional wins (12) ==
=== Safari Circuit wins (5) ===
- 1974 Kenya Open
- 1975 Nigerian Open
- 1977 Nigerian Open
- 1982 Nigerian Open, Kalahari Diamond Classic (Botswana)

=== Other wins (7) ===
- 4 Yorkshire Open wins
- 2 Northern PGA Championship wins
- 1980 Slazenger PGA Club Professionals' Championship

== Results in major championships ==
Tournament	1970	1971	1972	1973	1974	1975	1976	1977	1978	1979	1980	1981	1982
The Open Championship	CUT		CUT	T51	T28	CUT	T38		CUT	CUT	T60	CUT	CUT

Note: Jagger only played in The Open Championship.

Did not play

CUT = missed the half-way cut (3rd round cut in 1972 and 1981 Open Championships)
"T" indicates a tie for a place

== Team appearances ==
Professional

- Hennessy Cognac Cup (representing Great Britain and Ireland): 1976 (winners)
- PGA Cup: 1980
