= Safari Circuit =

Golf tour based in Africa

- Sport: Golf
- Founded: 1970s
- Folded: c. 1993
- Countries: Botswana, Ivory Coast, Kenya, Nigeria, Zambia, Zimbabwe
- Related competitions: European Tour; Challenge Tour; Sunshine Tour

The Safari Circuit, or Safari Tour, was a small professional golf tour based in West and East Africa that ran from the 1970s through into the 1990s. From 1977, the tour was organised by the PGA European Tour and from 1991 the tournaments were included on the second-tier Challenge Tour schedule.

== History ==
The Safari Circuit developed in the late 1960s as British professionals sought to play some competitive tournament golf while working in Africa during the winter prior to the start of the tournament circuit in Great Britain and Ireland. Originally centred around a few tournaments in Kenya and Zambia, as it evolved the tour became known colloquially as the "safari circuit" or "safari tour". The Cock o' the North tournament at Ndola Golf Club in Ndola, Zambia had been held since 1954, being mostly patronised by players from Southern and Central Africa. When the Kenya Open was founded in 1967, followed by the Lusaka Open in 1969 and the Mufulira Open in 1970, attracting professionals from Great Britain and Ireland, the circuit began to form.

In 1972, the Zambia Open was founded, which was initially hosted in rotation by the three existing tournament hosts (Lusaka, Mufulira, Ndola). In the mid-1970s, the Nigerian Open was also included with the circuit being split into legs in West and East Africa. There were many other smaller events surrounding the main tournaments, such as the Gambian and Liberian opens, and the Benin and Port Harcourt pro-ams in Nigeria. In 1977, the British Professional Golfers' Association assumed control of the circuit and the number of Zambian events was reduced to two in order to accommodate the fledgling European Tour, which was starting earlier in the year. During this period the Ndola and Mufulira events alternated on the schedule, with Lusaka being held annually. In the 1980s the Ivory Coast Open, Kalahari Diamond Classic (for one year only, in 1982) and Zimbabwe Open were added. As a result, in 1986 the number of tournaments in Zambia was reduced to just one, the Zambia Open at Lusaka.

With the PGA European Tour operating the circuit, tournament winners were rewarded with exemption on the main tour for that season. The leading money winners were also granted exemption on the tour, and until 1986 the Order of Merit winner was automatically qualified into The Open Championship. In the mid-1980s the circuit suffered as local economies struggled, with prize-money payments from Ivory Coast and Nigerian tournaments being reduced and delayed, culminating in the removal of the West African legs in 1987. As the European Tour schedule expanded further through the 1980s, the Safari Circuit became further squeezed, and the Nigerian and Ivory Coast opens were moved into December. In 1991 the five remaining tournaments were added to the new second-tier Challenge Tour schedule, although for a few years the "Safari Circuit" was still regarded as distinct tour.

== Tournaments ==
- Zambia
  - Cock o' the North (founded 1954, last played 1985)
  - Lusaka Open (founded 1969, last played 1979)
  - Mufulira Open (founded 1970, last played 1984)
  - Zambia Open (founded 1972)
- Kenya
  - Kenya Open (founded 1967)
- Nigeria
  - Nigerian Open (founded 1970)
- Botswana
  - Kalahari Diamond Classic (1982 only)
- Ivory Coast
  - Ivory Coast Open (founded 1981)
- Zimbabwe
  - Zimbabwe Open (founded 1985)

== Order of Merit winners ==
Season	Order of Merit winner	Ref
1977	Mark James	
1978		
1979	John Morgan	
1980	Brian Waites	
1981	Brian Barnes	
1982	David Jagger	
1983	Gordon J. Brand	
1984	Ewen Murray	
1985	Bill Longmuir	
1986	Gordon J. Brand	
1987	Gordon J. Brand	
1988	Vijay Singh	
1989	Vijay Singh	
1990		
