= 2006 PGA of Argentina Tour =

The 2006 PGA of Argentina Tour was a season of golf tournaments on the PGA of Argentina Tour, the official professional golf tour of Argentina. The season ran from the end of January to the beginning of December, and consisted of nineteen tournaments.

Disputes within the PGA of Argentina escalated during the year, leading eventually to the formation of the TPG Tour in 2007. As a result, the 2006 season was the last time the tour ran a full series of events that included all the major opens in Argentina.

The Order of Merit was won by Andrés Romero, ahead of Rafael Echenique in second, and Ángel Cabrera in third.

Five events were co-sanctioned by the Tour de las Americas, the highest level tour in Latin America, with the Argentine Open also being co-sanctioned by the Challenge Tour.

== Schedule of tournaments ==
Date	Tournament	Winner	Purse ($)	Notes
30 Jan	Acantilados Grand Prix	Juan Pablo Abbate		
2 Feb	South Open	Luciano Giometti		
9 Feb	Carilo Open	Daniel Vancsik		
16 Feb	Pinamar Open	Juan Pablo Abbate		
18 Mar	Parana Open	Ricardo González		
6 Apr	Norpatagonico Open	Rodolfo González		
13 Apr	Center Open	Ángel Cabrera		Co-sanctioned by the TLA
19 Apr	Misiones Open	César Costilla		
27 Apr	Chaco Open	Miguel Fernandez		
8 Jun	North Open	Andrés Romero		
20 Sep	Salta Open	Agustin Jauretche		
28 Sep	Tandil Open	Julio Zapata		
2 Nov	Argentine Masters	Andrés Romero		Co-sanctioned by the TLA
9 Nov	Roberto de Vicenzo Classic	Rodolfo González		
16 Nov	Abierto del Litoral	Andrés Romero		Co-sanctioned by the TLA
26 Nov	San Luis Open	Rafael Gómez		Co-sanctioned by the TLA
1 Dec	Argentine Open	Rafael Echenique		Co-sanctioned by the TLA and Challenge Tour
8 Dec	SHA Grand Prix	Jorge Berendt		
15 Dec	Argentine PGA Championship	Suspended		
