= 2008 TPG Tour =

Golf tour season

2008 TPG Tour season
- Duration: 7 February 2008 – 14 December 2008
- Number of official events: 16
- Most wins: (Argentina) Rafael Gómez (3)
- Order of Merit: (Argentina) Estanislao Goya

The 2008 TPG Tour was the second season of the TPG Tour, the main professional golf tour in Argentina since it was formed in 2007.

== Schedule ==
The following table lists official events during the 2008 season.

Date	Tournament	Location	Purse (Arg$)	Winner (Note: The number in brackets after each winner's name is the number of TPG Tour events they had won up to and including that tournament.)	OWGR points	Other tours (Note: CAN − Canadian Tour; CHA − Challenge Tour; TLA − Tour de las Américas.)
10 Feb	Abierto de Cariló	Buenos Aires	90,000	(Argentina) Rafael Gómez (3)	n/a	
16 Mar	Abierto de la Mesopotamia	Entre Ríos	90,000	(Argentina) Rafael Gómez (4)	n/a	
30 Mar	Abierto Visa del Centro	Córdoba	US$200,000	(Argentina) Estanislao Goya (1)	12	CHA, TLA
6 Apr	Abierto Visa de la República	Buenos Aires	US$200,000	(Finland) Antti Ahokas (n/a)	12	CHA, TLA
27 Apr	Abierto Norpatagónico	Buenos Aires	100,000	(Argentina) Daniel Altamirano (1)	n/a	
4 May	Abierto de Misiones	Misiones	90,000	(Argentina) Paulo Pinto (1)	n/a	
17 May	Abierto del Norte	Tucumán	120,000	(Argentina) Andrés Romero (3)	n/a	
20 Sep	Abierto de Salta	Salta	90,000	(Argentina) Julio Zapata (2)	n/a	
12 Oct	Golf Play Classic	Buenos Aires	90,000	(Argentina) Leonardo Machado (1)	n/a	
26 Oct	Carlos Franco Invitational	Paraguay	US$40,000	(Argentina) Clodomiro Carranza (1)	n/a	TLA
9 Nov	Abierto de San Luis	San Luis	200,000	(Argentina) Rafael Gómez (5)	n/a	TLA
16 Nov	Abierto del Litoral	Santa Fe	150,000	(Argentina) Andrés Romero (4)	n/a	TLA
23 Nov	Roberto De Vicenzo Classic	Buenos Aires	135,000	(Argentina) Paulo Pinto (2)	n/a	TLA
30 Nov	Ángel Cabrera Classic	Córdoba	165,000	(Argentina) César Monasterio (1)	n/a	
7 Dec	Torneo de Maestros	Buenos Aires	US$140,000	(Argentina) Fabián Gómez (2)	14	CAN, TLA
14 Dec	Abierto del Sur	Buenos Aires	130,000	(Argentina) Julio Zapata (3)	n/a	

== Order of Merit ==
The Order of Merit was based on tournament results during the season, calculated using a points-based system.

Position	Player	Points
1	(Argentina) Estanislao Goya	159,874
2	(Argentina) Andrés Romero	112,217
3	(Argentina) Rafael Gómez	86,184
4	(Argentina) Martin Monguzzi	81,570
5	(Argentina) Rodolfo González	75,775
