= 2004 Argentine Professional Golf Tour =

The 2004 Argentine Professional Golf Tour was a season of golf tournaments on the Argentine Professional Golf Tour (TAPG), the then official professional golf tour of Argentina. The season ran from the end of January to the beginning of December, and consisted of 13 tournaments.

The Order of Merit was won by José Cóceres, ahead of Ángel Cabrera in second, and Rafael Echenique in third.

One event, the South Open, was co-sanctioned by the Tour de las Americas, the highest level tour in Latin America.

== Schedule of tournaments ==
Tournament	Winner
South Open	Ángel Cabrera
Acantilados Grand Prix	Horacio Carbonetti
Carilo Open	Alfonso Barrera
Miramar Open	Juan Pablo Abbate
Center Open	Carlos Franco
Norpatagonico Open	Rodolfo González
North Open	Ángel Cabrera
Villa Mercedes Grand Prix	Fabián Gómez
La Rioja Open	Julio Noguera
Salta Open	Rafael Echenique
Smithfield Grand Prix	Rubén Alvarez
Argentine PGA Championship	José Cóceres
Argentine Open	José Cóceres
