= Ángel Cabrera =

Argentine golfer (born 1969)

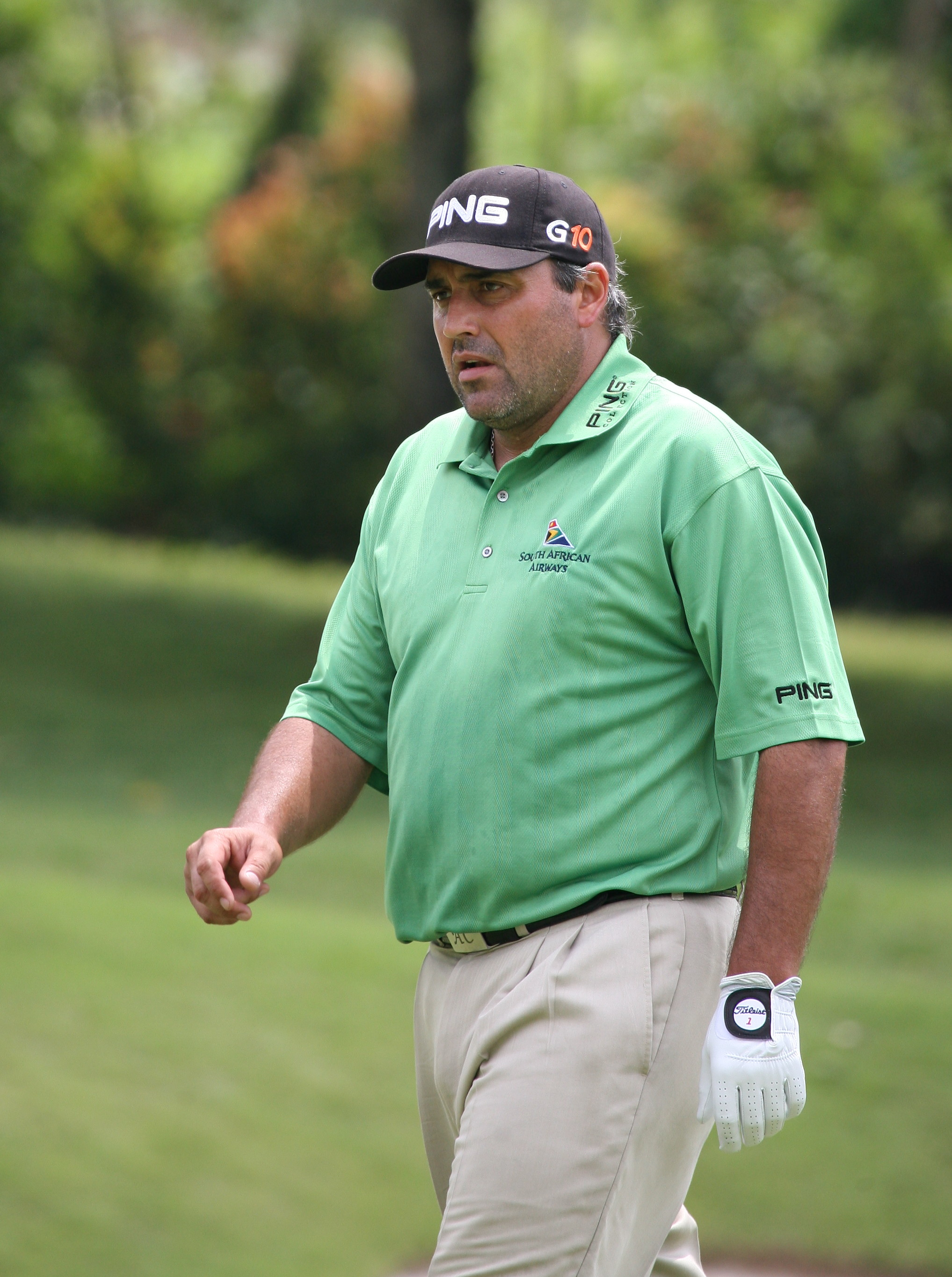
- Cabrera in 2007

Personal information
- Full name: Ángel Leopoldo Cabrera
- Nickname: El Pato (The Duck)
- Nationality: Argentina
- Born: 12 September 1969 (age 57) Córdoba, Argentina
- Height: 6 ft 0 in (1.83 m)
- Weight: 210 lb (95 kg; 15 st)
- Children: 2

Career
- Sport: Golf
- Turned professional: 1989
- Current tour: European Senior Tour
- Former tours: PGA Tour; European Tour; Tour de las Américas; TPG Tour
- Professional wins: 57
- Highest ranking: 9 (2 October 2005)

Number of wins by tour
- PGA Tour: 3
- European Tour: 5
- Asian Tour: 1
- PGA Tour Champions: 3
- European Senior Tour: 2
- Other: 47

Best results in major championships (wins: 2)
- Masters Tournament: Won: 2009
- PGA Championship: T19: 2000
- U.S. Open: Won: 2007
- The Open Championship: T4: 1999

Ángel Leopoldo Cabrera (pronounced [ˈaŋxel kaˈβɾeɾa]; born 12 September 1969) is an Argentine professional golfer who has played on both the European Tour and PGA Tour. He is known affectionately as "El Pato" in Spanish ("The Duck") for his waddling gait. He is a two-time major champion, with wins at the U.S. Open in 2007 and the Masters in 2009; he was the first Argentine and South American to win either. He also lost in a sudden death playoff at the Masters in 2013.

== Early life ==
Born in Córdoba, Argentina, Cabrera's father, Miguel, was a handyman, and his mother worked as a maid. He was three or four when his parents split up and was left in the care of his paternal grandmother. Cabrera stayed with her until he was 16, when he moved in a few feet away, to the house of Silvia, twelve years his senior, and a mother of four boys. They had a son, Federico, followed by another, Ángel.

When Cabrera was 10, he became a caddy at the Córdoba Country Club, which he says almost became his home. He learned golf playing against other caddies for money. His fierce determination and powerful swing soon caught the eye of members, one of whom, Juan Cruz Molina, a local real estate magnate, bought him his first set of clubs when he was 16.

With his stocky figure and habit of smoking at every hole, Cabrera cut a distinctive figure on the course. He is also acknowledged as having one of the biggest swings in the game. His son Federico became a professional golfer in 2008 and entered the PGA Tour's qualifying school in 2011, but was eliminated in the second stage. His other son, Ángel, became a professional in 2012 and joined the Canadian Tour. The elder Ángel and his sons also compete on PGA Tour Latinoamérica.

== Professional career ==
=== European Tour ===
Cabrera turned professional at age twenty and his first three visits to the European Tour Qualifying School were unsuccessful. On his fourth trip in 1995, made with Molina's financial assistance, he qualified for membership of the European Tour in 1996. Cabrera retained his card comfortably in his first three seasons and improved substantially to tenth on the Order of Merit in 1999. He has since finished in the top 15 of the Order of Merit on seven occasions, with a best placing of fifth in 2005.

Cabrera's first European Tour win was the 2001 Argentine Open, which was sanctioned by the European Tour on a one-time basis that year. In 2005, he won the BMW Championship, the most prestigious event on the European Tour outside the majors and the World Golf Championships. However, it was only his third European Tour win, a tally which was perhaps disappointing given his consistent form on the tour. At that point, Cabrera had also won seven non-European Tour events in Latin America, where the standard of play is much lower than on the European Tour.

Cabrera featured a highest of 9th in the Official World Golf Ranking on 2 October 2005. He was the top-ranked Latin American player for a number of years before the emerging pair of Andrés Romero and Camilo Villegas won PGA Tour tournaments in 2008.

=== PGA Tour ===
Cabrera earned enough money ($623,504) on the PGA Tour in 2006 playing as a non-member to earn a tour card for 2007. He has played almost full-time in 2007, 2008, and 2009.

In 2009, Cabrera announced partnership with Gary Player Design to collaborate on a golf course design business with a focus in Latin America. This coincides with golf, the Olympics and Brazil coming together in 2016.

Cabrera won his first major championship at the 2007 U.S. Open at Oakmont near Pittsburgh. He finished the tournament at 5-over, topping runners-up Tiger Woods and Jim Furyk by one stroke. Cabrera entered the third round as the leader at even par, after finishing the first round at 1-under, and shooting 1-over on the second day. He struggled during the third round, finishing 6 strokes over par, putting him 4 strokes behind Aaron Baddeley and two behind Woods. Cabrera rebounded and came back strong on the last day. He birdied one of the longest par-3 holes in major championship history when he sank a 20-foot (6 m) putt at the 8th hole, which played at a lengthy 300 yards (274 m) on Sunday. Cabrera finished one stroke under par, bringing him down to 5-over (285) for the championship, just enough to secure his first career major victory. At a post-round interview Cabrera said "Well, there are some players that have psychologists, some have sportologists, I smoke."

Cabrera became the first Argentine player to win the U.S. Open and the second to win a major, joining Roberto De Vicenzo, who won the British Open in 1967 at Royal Liverpool (Hoylake). Cabrera received the 2007 Olimpia de Oro ("Golden Olympia") as Argentina's sportsperson of the year.

Cabrera won the Masters Tournament in 2009 in a three-way sudden-death playoff, seeing off Chad Campbell after the first playoff hole, and defeating Kenny Perry on the second. On the first playoff hole, the 18th, Cabrera missed right of the fairway, leaving his ball stymied directly behind a tree. On his second shot, he hit a shot right of the tree that would have sent the golf ball onto the 10th hole fairway, but ended up hitting another tree about 30 yards (27 m) ahead, bouncing left and settling in the center of the 18th fairway. He and Perry both got up-and-down for par, while Campbell missed his 4-foot (1.2 m) par putt and was eliminated. On the second playoff hole, the 10th, Cabrera made par to defeat Perry, becoming the first Argentine to win the Masters. He was the lowest-ranked golfer to win the Masters, having been ranked 69th before the tournament.

In 2011, Cabrera was in the mix to win a second Green Jacket at Augusta when he was in the final pairing on Sunday, four strokes behind leader Rory McIlroy. Cabrera was tied for the lead at one point during the afternoon, but bogeys on 12 and 16 derailed his chances. He posted a final round 71 which placed him in sole seventh, five strokes behind the South African Charl Schwartzel. This was however Cabrera's best finish in a major tournament since his win back in 2009. He missed the cut in the years other three major championships and failed to qualify for the season ending FedEx Cup playoffs, finishing 154th in the standings. His best finish of the season was a T6 in the fall season at the McGladrey Classic.

At the Masters in 2013, Cabrera was again in the final pairing on Sunday. After taking a two shot lead on the front nine, Cabrera proceeded to lose the lead and after failing to birdie the par-5 15th and was two shots behind leader Jason Day. Day then bogeyed two holes in succession and when Cabrera made a 20-foot putt for birdie at the 16th he tied Adam Scott and Day briefly for the lead. As Cabrera stood on the 18th fairway, up ahead on the green and playing in the penultimate group, Scott holed a birdie putt to take the lead. Cabrera hit a 163-yard (149 m) 7-iron to 3 feet (0.9 m) and knocked in the putt to force a playoff. On the first playoff hole, Scott's second shot was 160 yards (146 m) out, but rolled back off the front of the green. Cabrera's second shot also came up short, rolling back off the green and coming to rest behind Scott's ball. Cabrera's chip just slid by the hole. Both players then made par sending them onto the 10th for the second playoff hole. Scott and Cabrera hit their tee shots in the fairway and matched each other with approach shots which landed on the green giving both birdie chances, Cabrera with 18 feet (5 m) uphill and Scott a downhill right to left 12 footer. Cabrera's putt was a turn away from dropping in, giving Scott a chance to win with his putt. Scott made the putt defeating Cabrera and bringing Australia their first ever green jacket.

Although Cabrera was fully exempt on the PGA Tour, he occasionally competed in Argentinian events on PGA Tour Latinoamérica, a developmental tour in Latin America whose 2013 members included former PGA Tour winners Carlos Franco and Ted Purdy. Cabrera won the 2012 Visa Open de Argentina and the 2013 Abierto del Centro.

Cabrera won the Greenbrier Classic in West Virginia on 6 July 2014, his first PGA Tour victory since claiming the green jacket in 2009. It was his third win in the United States, but his first non-major win on the PGA Tour. Cabrera shot a six-under-par 64 on both Saturday and Sunday to secure the title, winning $1.17 million

Cabrera finished in the top-25 only twice and wound up 170th on the PGA Tour's money list.

== Personal life ==
In January 2021, Cabrera was arrested in Brazil on an Interpol notice after leaving Argentina without court permission while facing domestic violence allegations. He was extradited in June 2021 and later convicted for assault and threats against a former partner and received a two-year prison sentence the following month. In November 2022, he was convicted again on similar charges involving another former partner and received an additional 28-month sentence. The sentences were served concurrently. Cabrera was released on parole in August 2023 after serving approximately 30 months in custody. Cabrera was cleared to play in PGA Tour-sanctioned events in December 2023.

== Team appearances ==
- Presidents Cup (representing the International team): 2005, 2007, 2009, 2013

== Professional wins (57) ==
=== PGA Tour wins (3) ===
Legend
Major championships (2)
Other PGA Tour (1)

No.	Date	Tournament	Winning score	To par	Margin of victory	Runner(s)-up
1	17 Jun 2007	U.S. Open	69-71-76-69=285	+5	1 stroke	(United States) Jim Furyk, (United States) Tiger Woods
2	12 Apr 2009	Masters Tournament	68-68-69-71=276	−12	Playoff	(United States) Chad Campbell, (United States) Kenny Perry
3	6 July 2014	Greenbrier Classic	68-68-64-64=264	−16	2 strokes	(United States) George McNeill

PGA Tour playoff record (1–1)

No.	Year	Tournament	Opponent(s)	Result
1	2009	Masters Tournament	(United States) Chad Campbell, (United States) Kenny Perry	Won with par on second extra hole Campbell eliminated by par on first hole
2	2013	Masters Tournament	(Australia) Adam Scott	Lost to birdie on second extra hole

=== European Tour wins (5) ===
Legend
Major championships (2)
Flagship events (1)
Other European Tour (2)

No.	Date	Tournament	Winning score	To par	Margin of victory	Runner(s)-up
1	1 Apr 2001	Open de Argentina^{1}	67-65-69-67=268	−12	2 strokes	(Sweden) Carl Pettersson
2	12 May 2002	Benson & Hedges International Open	68-73-68-69=278	−10	1 stroke	(England) Barry Lane
3	29 May 2005	BMW Championship	70-70-66-67=273	−15	2 strokes	(Republic of Ireland) Paul McGinley
4	17 Jun 2007	U.S. Open	69-71-76-69=285	+5	1 stroke	(United States) Jim Furyk, (United States) Tiger Woods
5	12 Apr 2009	Masters Tournament	68-68-69-71=276	−12	Playoff	(United States) Chad Campbell, (United States) Kenny Perry

^{1}Co-sanctioned by the PGA of Argentina Tour

European Tour playoff record (1–2)

No.	Year	Tournament	Opponent(s)	Result
1	2005	Deutsche Bank Players Championship of Europe	(Sweden) Niclas Fasth	Lost to birdie on third extra hole
2	2009	Masters Tournament	(United States) Chad Campbell, (United States) Kenny Perry	Won with par on second extra hole Campbell eliminated by par on first hole
3	2013	Masters Tournament	(Australia) Adam Scott	Lost to birdie on second extra hole

=== Asian Tour wins (1) ===
No.	Date	Tournament	Winning score	To par	Margin of victory	Runner-up
1	4 Nov 2007	Barclays Singapore Open	71-63-70-72=276	−8	1 stroke	(Fiji) Vijay Singh

=== PGA Tour Latinoamérica wins (2) ===
No.	Date	Tournament	Winning score	To par	Margin of victory	Runner(s)-up
1	16 Dec 2012	Visa Open de Argentina	65-70-71-64=270	−18	4 strokes	(Argentina) Miguel Ángel Carballo, (Mexico) Óscar Fraustro
2	21 Apr 2013	Abierto OSDE del Centro	72-72-76-64=284	E	Playoff	(Argentina) Rafael Gómez

=== Tour de las Américas wins (8) ===
No.	Date	Tournament	Winning score	To par	Margin of victory	Runner(s)-up
1	29 Nov 1999	Torneo de Maestros Telefónica	271	−13		(United States) Scott Dunlap, (Argentina) Fabian Montovia, (Italy) Costantino Rocca
2	9 Dec 2001	Torneo de Maestros Telefónica (2)	66-65-72-69=272	−12	2 strokes	(Argentina) Eduardo Romero
3	1 Dec 2002	Abierto de Argentina	70-62-68-69=269	−11	4 strokes	(Argentina) José Cóceres
4	1 Feb 2004	Abierto del Sur^{1}	65-69-69-67=270	−10	1 stroke	(Argentina) Miguel Guzmán
5	6 Nov 2005	Torneo de Maestros^{1} (3)	66-74-70-68=278	−6	3 strokes	(Argentina) Julio Zapata
6	15 Apr 2006	Abierto Visa del Centro^{1}	68-67-70-70=275	−9	Playoff	(Argentina) Eduardo Romero
7	15 Apr 2007	Abierto Visa del Centro^{2}	66-75-73-65=279	−5	2 strokes	(Paraguay) Raúl Fretes
8	27 Oct 2007	Torneo de Maestros^{2} (4)	68-73-71-65=277	−7	Playoff	(Argentina) Ricardo González

^{1}Co-sanctioned by the PGA of Argentina Tour
^{2}Co-sanctioned by the TPG Tour

=== TPG Tour wins (4) ===
No.	Date	Tournament	Winning score	To par	Margin of victory	Runner-up
1	15 Apr 2007	Abierto Visa del Centro^{1}	66-75-73-65=279	−5	2 strokes	(Paraguay) Raúl Fretes
2	27 Oct 2007	Torneo de Maestros^{1}	68-73-71-65=277	−7	Playoff	(Argentina) Ricardo González
3	22 Dec 2012	Ángel Cabrera Classic	70-68-66-71=275	−13	6 strokes	(Argentina) Ricardo González
4	14 Dec 2013	Ángel Cabrera Classic (2)	72-62-69-67=270	−18	Playoff	(Argentina) Miguel Ángel Carballo

=== Argentine Tour wins (23) ===
- 1991 San Diego Grand Prix
- 1992 Norpatagonico Open
- 1994 Villa Gessel Grand Prix, South Open, Center Open, Nautico Hacoaj Grand Prix
- 1995 Abierto del Litoral
- 1996 South Open, Santiago del Estero Open
- 1997 Center Open
- 1998 Argentine PGA Championship
- 2000 Center Open, Bariloche Match Play, Desafio de Maestros
- 2001 Center Open, Argentine Open^{1}
- 2002 Argentine PGA Championship
- 2004 South Open^{2}, North Open
- 2005 Center Open, North Open, Argentine Masters^{2}
- 2006 Center Open^{2}

^{1}Co-sanctioned by the European Tour
^{2}Co-sanctioned by the Tour de las Américas

=== Cordoba Tour wins (6) ===
- 2001 (2) Ascochingas Tournament, La Cumbre Tournament
- 2002 (2) Rio Cuarto Tournament, Las Delicias Tournament
- 2008 (1) Cordoba PGA Championship
- 2009 (1) Angel Cabrera Tour 2nd Tournament

=== Other wins (9) ===
- 1995 (2) Paraguay Open, El Rodeo Open (Colombia)
- 1996 (2) Volvo Masters of Latin America (Brazil), Viña del Mar Open (Chile)
- 1998 (1) Brazil Open
- 1999 (1) Brazil Open
- 2007 (1) PGA Grand Slam of Golf
- 2009 (1) Gary Player Invitational (with Tony Johnstone)
- 2017 (1) PNC Father-Son Challenge (with Ángel Jr.)

=== PGA Tour Champions wins (3) ===
Legend
PGA Tour Champions major championships (2)
Other PGA Tour Champions (1)

No.	Date	Tournament	Winning score	To par	Margin of victory	Runner(s)-up
1	6 Apr 2025	James Hardie Pro-Football Hall of Fame Invitational	68-66-71=205	−11	2 strokes	(South Korea) K. J. Choi
2	19 May 2025	Regions Tradition	70-67-67-64=268	−20	1 stroke	(United States) Jerry Kelly
3	25 May 2025	Senior PGA Championship	72-69-70-69=280	−8	1 stroke	(Denmark) Thomas Bjørn, (Republic of Ireland) Pádraig Harrington

=== European Senior Tour wins (2) ===
Legend
Senior major championships (1)
Other European Senior Tour (1)

No.	Date	Tournament	Winning score	To par	Margin of victory	Runner(s)-up
1	16 Jun 2024	Paul Lawrie Matchplay	3 and 1			(South Africa) James Kingston
2	25 May 2025	Senior PGA Championship	72-69-70-69=280	−8	1 stroke	(Denmark) Thomas Bjørn, (Republic of Ireland) Pádraig Harrington

== Major championships ==
=== Wins (2) ===
Year	Championship	54 holes	Winning score	Margin	Runners-up
2007	U.S. Open	4 shot deficit	+5 (69-71-76-69=285)	1 stroke	(United States) Jim Furyk, (United States) Tiger Woods
2009	Masters Tournament	Tied for lead	−12 (68-68-69-71=276)	Playoff^{1}	(United States) Chad Campbell, (United States) Kenny Perry

^{1}Defeated Kenny Perry and Chad Campbell in a sudden-death playoff: Cabrera (4-4), Perry (4-5) and Campbell (5).

=== Results timeline ===
Tournament	1997	1998	1999
Masters Tournament			
U.S. Open			
The Open Championship	T51		T4
PGA Championship			T41

Tournament	2000	2001	2002	2003	2004	2005	2006	2007	2008	2009
Masters Tournament	CUT	T10	T9	T15	CUT	CUT	T8	T37	T25	1
U.S. Open	T37	T7	T66	T35	16	T33	T26	1	CUT	T54
The Open Championship	CUT	CUT	CUT	T22		CUT	7	34	CUT	T24
PGA Championship	T19	T37	T48	T45	CUT		CUT	CUT	T20	T63

Tournament	2010	2011	2012	2013	2014	2015	2016	2017	2018
Masters Tournament	T18	7	T32	2	CUT	T22	T24	CUT	CUT
U.S. Open	T22	CUT	T46	CUT	CUT	T64	T37	CUT	
The Open Championship	CUT	CUT	CUT	T11	T19				
PGA Championship	CUT	CUT	CUT	WD	WD				

Tournament	2019	2020	2021	2022	2023	2024	2025	2026
Masters Tournament	CUT						CUT	CUT
PGA Championship								
U.S. Open								
The Open Championship								

Win
Top 10
Did not play

WD = withdrew
CUT = missed the half way cut
"T" indicates a tie for a place.

=== Summary ===
Tournament	Wins	2nd	3rd	Top-5	Top-10	Top-25	Events	Cuts made
Masters Tournament	1	1	0	2	6	11	22	13
PGA Championship	0	0	0	0	0	2	15	7
U.S. Open	1	0	0	1	2	4	18	13
The Open Championship	0	0	0	1	2	6	16	8
Totals	2	1	0	4	10	23	71	41

- Most consecutive cuts made – 7 (2008 PGA – 2010 U.S. Open)
- Longest streak of top-10s – 2 (2001 Masters – 2001 U.S. Open)

== Results in The Players Championship ==
Tournament	2001	2002	2003	2004	2005	2006	2007	2008	2009
The Players Championship	T26	T36	CUT		CUT	CUT		CUT	T14

Tournament	2010	2011	2012	2013	2014	2015
The Players Championship	CUT	T41	WD	T55	T38	WD

Did not play

CUT = missed the half-way cut
WD = withdrew
"T" indicates a tie for a place.

== Results in World Golf Championships ==
Tournament	1999	2000	2001	2002	2003	2004	2005	2006	2007	2008	2009	2010	2011	2012	2013	2014
Match Play		R64		R64	R32		R32	R32	R64	QF	R64	R64				
Championship	T25	T17	NT^{1}	T36		T16	T18	T26	T19	WD		T50				
Invitational				T19	T23	T4	T41	T4	T69	T36	T4	T33			T38	T31
Champions																

^{1}Cancelled due to 9/11

Top 10
Did not play

QF, R16, R32, R64 = Round in which player lost in match play
"T" = tied
NT = No tournament
Note that the HSBC Champions did not become a WGC event until 2009.

== Senior major championships ==
=== Wins (2) ===
Year	Championship	54 holes	Winning score	Margin	Runner(s)-up
2025	Regions Tradition	3 shot deficit	−20 (70-67-67-64=268)	1 stroke	(United States) Jerry Kelly
2025	Senior PGA Championship	Tied for lead	−8 (72-69-70-69=280)	1 stroke	(Denmark) Thomas Bjørn, (Republic of Ireland) Pádraig Harrington

=== Results timeline ===
Results not in chronological order

Tournament	2020	2021	2022	2023	2024	2025	2026
Senior PGA Championship	NT					1	CUT
The Tradition	NT					1	T45
U.S. Senior Open	NT					CUT	CUT
Senior Players Championship	T70				T17	T21	T14
Senior British Open Championship	NT				T5	T31	

Win
Top 10
Did not play

CUT = missed the halfway cut
"T" indicates a tie for a place
NT = no tournament due to COVID-19 pandemic

== Team appearances ==
- Alfred Dunhill Cup (representing Argentina): 1997, 1998, 2000
- World Cup (representing Argentina): 1998, 1999, 2000, 2001, 2002, 2003, 2004, 2005, 2006
- Presidents Cup (International Team): 2005, 2007, 2009, 2013

Awards
Preceded by (Argentina) Germán Chiaraviglio	Olimpia de Oro; 2007	Succeeded by (Argentina) Juan Curuchet (Argentina) Walter Pérez
