= 2013 TPG Tour =

Golf tour season

2013 TPG Tour season
- Duration: 21 February 2013 – 21 December 2013
- Number of official events: 14
- Most wins: (Argentina) Daniel Barbetti (2) (Argentina) Julio Zapata (2)
- Order of Merit: (Argentina) César Costilla

The 2013 TPG Tour was the seventh season of the TPG Tour, the main professional golf tour in Argentina since it was formed in 2007.

== Schedule ==
The following table lists official events during the 2013 season.

Date	Tournament	Location	Purse (Arg$)	Winner (Note: The number in brackets after each winner's name is the number of TPG Tour events they had won up to and including that tournament.)
24 Feb	Abierto del Sur	Buenos Aires	220,000	(Argentina) Sebastián Saavedra (1)
9 Mar	Abierto Norpatagónico	Buenos Aires	170,000	(Argentina) Félix Córdoba (1)
20 Jul	Abierto Termas de Río Hondo	Santiago del Estero	250,000	(Argentina) Julio Zapata (5)
10 Aug	Abierto del Nordeste	Chaco	120,000	(Argentina) Daniel Barbetti (2)
18 Aug	Abierto de Misiones	Misiones	250,000	(Argentina) César Costilla (3)
6 Oct	Argentine PGA Championship	Buenos Aires	400,000	(Argentina) Rafael Gómez (8)
13 Oct	San Eliseo Copa Gangoni	Buenos Aires	300,000	(Argentina) Miguel Guzmán (2)
26 Oct	Andrés Romero Invitational	Tucumán	250,000	(Argentina) Sebastián Fernández (3)
2 Nov	Carlos Franco Invitational	Paraguay	US$40,000	(Argentina) Daniel Barbetti (3)
10 Nov	Gran Premio Los Pingüinos	Buenos Aires	120,000	(Argentina) Fermín Noste (1)
17 Nov	Gran Premio Las Praderas	Buenos Aires	220,000	(Argentina) Nelson Ledesma (3)
24 Nov	Abierto del Litoral	Santa Fe	300,000	(Argentina) Ricardo González (5)
14 Dec	Ángel Cabrera Classic	Córdoba	300,000	(Argentina) Ángel Cabrera (4)
21 Dec	Abierto de San Luis	San Luis	170,000	(Argentina) Julio Zapata (6)

== Order of Merit ==
The Order of Merit was based on tournament results during the season, calculated using a points-based system.

Position	Player	Points
1	(Argentina) César Costilla	125,424
2	(Argentina) Rafael Gómez	123,150
3	(Argentina) Julio Zapata	118,432
4	(Argentina) Miguel Guzmán	113,719
5	(Paraguay) Carlos Franco	100,396

== See also ==
- 2013 PGA Tour Latinoamérica Developmental Series
