= 2019 TPG Tour =

Golf tour season

2019 TPG Tour season
- Duration: 14 February 2019 – 30 November 2019
- Number of official events: 7
- Most wins: (Argentina) César Costilla (2) (Argentina) Emilio Domínguez (2)
- Order of Merit: (Argentina) César Costilla

The 2019 TPG Tour was the 13th season of the TPG Tour, the main professional golf tour in Argentina since it was formed in 2007.

== Schedule ==
The following table lists official events during the 2019 season.

Date	Tournament	Location	Purse (Arg$)	Winner (Note: The number in brackets after each winner's name is the number of TPG Tour events they had won up to and including that tournament.)
17 Feb	Abierto del Sur	Buenos Aires	900,000	(Argentina) Estanislao Goya (3)
31 Mar	Abierto Norpatagónico	Buenos Aires	900,000	(Argentina) Mateo Fernández de Oliveira (a) (1)
26 May	Abierto del Norte	Tucumán	900,000	(Argentina) César Costilla (7)
15 Jun	Abierto Termas de Río Hondo	Santiago del Estero	1,300,000	(Argentina) Clodomiro Carranza (6)
20 Oct	Abierto Ciudad de Dolores	Buenos Aires	450,000	(Argentina) Emilio Domínguez (4)
26 Oct	Abierto del Litoral	Santa Fe	1,200,000	(Argentina) César Costilla (8)
30 Nov	Andrés Romero Invitational	Santiago del Estero	900,000	(Argentina) Emilio Domínguez (5)

== Order of Merit ==
The Order of Merit was based on tournament results during the season, calculated using a points-based system.

Position	Player	Points
1	(Argentina) César Costilla	472,900
2	(Argentina) Emilio Domínguez	282,280
3	(Argentina) Julio Zapata	270,700
4	(Argentina) Clodomiro Carranza	246,000
5	(Argentina) Ricardo González	243,450

== See also ==
- 2019 PGA Tour Latinoamérica Developmental Series
