= 2025 TPG Tour =

Golf tour season

2025 TPG Tour season
- Duration: 23 January 2025 – 7 December 2025
- Number of official events: 13 (Note: One further tournament was cancelled.)
- Most wins: (Argentina) Andrés Gallegos (3)
- Order of Merit: (Argentina) Franco Romero

The 2025 TPG Tour was the 19th season of the TPG Tour, the main professional golf tour in Argentina since it was formed in 2007.

== Schedule ==
The following table lists official events during the 2025 season.

Date	Tournament	Location	Purse (Arg$)	Winner (Note: The number in brackets after each winner's name is the number of TPG Tour events they had won up to and including that tournament.)
26 Jan	Abierto del Sur	Buenos Aires	36,000,000	(Argentina) Juan Tomás Arozena (1)
22 Mar	Abierto de General Pico	La Pampa	20,000,000	(Argentina) Andrés Gallegos (5)
13 Apr	Abierto Internacional del Este	Uruguay	US$32,000	(Argentina) Maximiliano Godoy (7)
4 May	Abierto Norpatagónico	Buenos Aires	38,000,000	(Argentina) César Costilla (12)
14 Jun	Abierto Termas de Río Hondo	Santiago del Estero	38,000,000	(Argentina) Andrés Gallegos (6)
31 Aug	Abierto de Chaco	Chaco	40,000,000	(Argentina) Fabián Gómez (10)
7 Sep	Abierto del Norte	Tucumán	41,000,000	(Argentina) Augusto Núñez (3)
12 Oct	Abierto de Salta	Salta	40,000,000	(Argentina) Franco Romero (4)
18 Oct	Andrés Romero Invitational	Santiago del Estero	35,000,000	(Argentina) Andrés Gallegos (7)
2 Nov	YPF Neuquén Invitational	Neuquén	40,000,000	(Argentina) Franco Scorzato (1)
15 Nov	Buenos Aires Classic	Buenos Aires	25,000,000	(Argentina) Fabián Gómez (11)
29 Nov	Abierto del Litoral	Santa Fe	60,000,000	(Argentina) Fabián Gómez (12)
7 Dec	Abierto del Oeste	Mendoza	45,000,000	(Argentina) Augusto Núñez (4)
~~21 Dec~~	Argentine PGA Championship	Buenos Aires	–	Cancelled

== Order of Merit ==
The Order of Merit was based on tournament results during the season, calculated using a points-based system.

Position	Player	Points
1	(Argentina) Franco Romero	1,606
2	(Argentina) César Costilla	1,279
3	(Argentina) Andrés Gallegos	1,252
4	(Argentina) Franco Scorzato	1,217
5	(Argentina) Fabián Gómez	1,186
