= 2024 TPG Tour =

Golf tour season

2024 TPG Tour season
- Duration: 25 January 2024 – 14 December 2024
- Number of official events: 15
- Most wins: (Argentina) Ignacio Marino (3)
- Order of Merit: (Argentina) Ignacio Marino

The 2024 TPG Tour was the 18th season of the TPG Tour, the main professional golf tour in Argentina since it was formed in 2007.

== Schedule ==
The following table lists official events during the 2024 season.

Date	Tournament	Location	Purse (Arg$)	Winner (Note: The number in brackets after each winner's name is the number of TPG Tour events they had won up to and including that tournament.)
28 Jan	Abierto del Sur	Buenos Aires	20,000,000	(Argentina) Julián Etulain (1)
16 Mar	Abierto de San Luis	San Luis	10,000,000	(Argentina) Franco Romero (3)
30 Mar	Abierto del Centro	Córdoba	23,000,000	(Argentina) Ignacio Marino (1)
21 Apr	Abierto de General Pico	La Pampa	10,000,000	(Argentina) Clodomiro Carranza (8)
28 Apr	Abierto Norpatagónico	Buenos Aires	20,000,000	(Argentina) Leonardo Ledesma (2)
26 May	Abierto Internacional del Este	Uruguay	US$30,000	(Argentina) Andrés Gallegos (4)
15 Jun	Abierto Termas de Río Hondo	Santiago del Estero	20,000,000	(Argentina) Ignacio Marino (2)
1 Sep	Nelson Ledesma Invitational	Tucumán	15,000,000	(Argentina) Fabián Gómez (9)
7 Sep	Abierto del Norte	Tucumán	28,000,000	(Argentina) Félix Córdoba (3)
19 Oct	Andrés Romero Invitational	Santiago del Estero	28,000,000	(Argentina) Mauro Báez (1)
10 Nov	Buenos Aires Classic	Buenos Aires	15,000,000	(Argentina) Leandro Marelli (5)
17 Nov	Abierto Links Pinamar	Buenos Aires	25,000,000	(Argentina) Aram Yenidjeian (1)
1 Dec	Argentine PGA Championship	Buenos Aires	36,000,000	(Argentina) Matías Simaski (3)
8 Dec	Abierto del Oeste	Mendoza	28,000,000	(Argentina) Ignacio Marino (3)
21 Dec	Abierto del Litoral	Santa Fe	36,000,000	(Argentina) Alejandro Tosti (2)

== Order of Merit ==
The Order of Merit was based on tournament results during the season, calculated using a points-based system.

Position	Player	Points
1	(Argentina) Ignacio Marino	1,329
2	(Argentina) Maximiliano Godoy	1,222
3	(Argentina) Félix Córdoba	1,169
4	(Argentina) Leonardo Ledesma	1,116
5	(Argentina) Andrés Gallegos	1,082
