= 2023 TPG Tour =

Golf tour season

2023 TPG Tour season
- Duration: 19 January 2023 – 16 December 2023
- Number of official events: 10
- Most wins: (Argentina) Nelson Ledesma (2)
- Order of Merit: (Argentina) Nelson Ledesma

The 2023 TPG Tour was the 17th season of the TPG Tour, the main professional golf tour in Argentina since it was formed in 2007.

== Schedule ==
The following table lists official events during the 2023 season.

Date	Tournament	Location	Purse (Arg$)	Winner (Note: The number in brackets after each winner's name is the number of TPG Tour events they had won up to and including that tournament.)
22 Jan	Abierto del Sur	Buenos Aires	6,000,000	(Argentina) Ricardo González (9)
5 Mar	Abierto de San Luis	San Luis	8,000,000	(Argentina) Emilio Domínguez (7)
11 Mar	Buenos Aires Classic	Buenos Aires	5,000,000	(Argentina) Santiago Bauni (3)
8 Apr	Abierto del Centro	Córdoba	8,000,000	(Argentina) Nelson Ledesma (6)
23 Apr	Abierto Norpatagónico	Buenos Aires	7,500,000	(Argentina) Leonardo Ledesma (1)
17 Jun	Abierto Termas de Río Hondo	Santiago del Estero	9,200,000	(Argentina) Andrés Romero (10)
9 Sep	Abierto del Norte	Tucumán	12,000,000	(Argentina) Nelson Ledesma (7)
14 Oct	Andrés Romero Invitational	Santiago del Estero	11,500,000	(Argentina) Fabián Gómez (8)
25 Nov	Abierto de San Vicente	Buenos Aires	6,000,000	(Argentina) Rafael Gómez (11)
16 Dec	Abierto del Litoral	Santa Fe	20,000,000	(Argentina) Joaquín Ludueña (a) (1)

== Order of Merit ==
The Order of Merit was based on tournament results during the season, calculated using a points-based system.

Position	Player	Points
1	(Argentina) Nelson Ledesma	1,369
2	(Argentina) Emilio Domínguez	769
3	(Argentina) Jorge Monroy	768
4	(Argentina) Maximiliano Godoy	747
5	(Argentina) Leonardo Ledesma	699

== See also ==
- 2022–23 PGA Tour Latinoamérica Developmental Series
