= 2018 TPG Tour =

Golf tour season

2018 TPG Tour season
- Duration: 25 January 2018 – 9 December 2018
- Number of official events: 10
- Most wins: (Argentina) Ricardo González (2) (Argentina) Leandro Marelli (2)
- Order of Merit: (Argentina) Ricardo González

The 2018 TPG Tour was the 12th season of the TPG Tour, the main professional golf tour in Argentina since it was formed in 2007.

== Schedule ==
The following table lists official events during the 2018 season.

Date	Tournament	Location	Purse (Arg$)	Winner (Note: The number in brackets after each winner's name is the number of TPG Tour events they had won up to and including that tournament.)
28 Jan	Abierto del Sur	Buenos Aires	700,000	(Argentina) Ricardo González (6)
29 Apr	Abierto Norpatagónico	Buenos Aires	700,000	(Argentina) Leandro Marelli (2)
16 Jun	Abierto Termas de Río Hondo	Santiago del Estero	1,000,000	(Uruguay) Juan Álvarez (1)
11 Aug	Abierto de Misiones	Misiones	400,000	(Argentina) Leandro Marelli (3)
18 Aug	Abierto Internacional de Golf AguaVista	Paraguay	420,000	(Argentina) Jorge Monroy (6)
30 Sep	Abierto de Salta	Salta	700,000	(Argentina) Ricardo González (7)
27 Oct	Gran Premio Los Pingüinos	Buenos Aires	400,000	(Argentina) Paulo Pinto (4)
24 Nov	Andrés Romero Invitational	Buenos Aires	500,000	(Chile) Mito Pereira (n/a)
30 Nov	Buenos Aires Classic	Buenos Aires	400,000	(Argentina) Julio Zapata (8)
9 Dec	Abierto del Norte	Tucumán	700,000	(Argentina) Jorge Monroy (7)

== Order of Merit ==
The Order of Merit was based on tournament results during the season, calculated using a points-based system.

Position	Player	Points
1	(Argentina) Ricardo González	414,660
2	(Argentina) Leandro Marelli	379,259
3	(Argentina) Jorge Monroy	293,398
4	(Argentina) Paulo Pinto	252,101
5	(Argentina) Julio Zapata	204,018

== See also ==
- 2018 PGA Tour Latinoamérica Developmental Series
