= Pinamar Open =

The Pinamar Open, or the Abierto de Pinamar, is a golf tournament on the TPG Tour, the official professional golf tour in Argentina. First held in 1970, it has always been held at the Links Pinamar Golf Club, in Pinamar, Buenos Aires Province. In 2010 was played the Buenos Aires Open (TPG Tour 2009).

== Winners ==
Year	Winner	Runner(s)-up
2010	Fabián Gómez	Cesar Costilla, Manuel Garcia
2009	No tournament	
2008	No tournament	
2007	Miguel Rodríguez	Julio Zapata
2006	Juan Pablo Abbate	Daniel Vancsik
2005	Rafael Gómez	Cesar Costilla
2001–04	No tournament	
2000	Daniel Vancsik	Julio Zapata, Roberto Coceres
1996–99	No tournament	
1995	Sebastián Fernández	
1994		
1993	José Cóceres	
1992	Jorge Soto	
1991	Rubén Alvarez	
1990		
1989	José Cóceres	
1988		
1987		
1986		
1985	Adan Sowa	
1984	Juan Carlos Molina*	
1983	Florentino Molina	Adan Sowa
1982	Vicente Fernández	Carlos Almaraz
1981		
1980	Juan Carlos Molina	
1979	Vicente Fernández	
1978		
1977		
1976		
1975		
1974		
1973	Roberto De Vicenzo	
1972		
1971	Roberto De Vicenzo	
1970		

* – won following playoff
