= 2016 TPG Tour =

Golf tour season

2016 TPG Tour season
- Duration: 11 February 2016 – 11 December 2016
- Number of official events: 10
- Most wins: (Argentina) Francisco Bidé (2)
- Order of Merit: (Argentina) Jorge Monroy

The 2016 TPG Tour was the 10th season of the TPG Tour, the main professional golf tour in Argentina since it was formed in 2007.

== Schedule ==
The following table lists official events during the 2016 season.

Date	Tournament	Location	Purse (Arg$)	Winner (Note: The number in brackets after each winner's name is the number of TPG Tour events they had won up to and including that tournament.)
14 Feb	Abierto del Sur	Buenos Aires	550,000	(Argentina) Francisco Bidé (2)
10 Apr	Abierto Norpatagónico	Buenos Aires	550,000	(Argentina) Sebastián Saavedra (3)
23 Apr	Abierto de La Rioja	La Rioja	250,000	(Argentina) Francisco Bidé (3)
16 Jul	Abierto Termas de Río Hondo	Santiago del Estero	400,000	(Argentina) Maximiliano Godoy (3)
25 Sep	Abierto del Norte	Salta	550,000	(Argentina) Jorge Monroy (4)
1 Oct	Fabián Gómez Classic	Chaco	300,000	(Argentina) Mariano Guiraldes (1)
5 Nov	Gran Premio Los Pingüinos	Buenos Aires	250,000	(Argentina) Daniel Vancsik (2)
27 Nov	Abierto del Litoral	Santa Fe	550,000	(Argentina) Thomas Baik (1)
4 Dec	Andrés Romero Invitational	Buenos Aires	500,000	(Argentina) Fabián Gómez (7)
11 Dec	Gran Premio Memorial Guillermo Daniel Ibañez	Buenos Aires	500,000	(Argentina) Sergio Acevedo (3)

== Order of Merit ==
The Order of Merit was based on tournament results during the season, calculated using a points-based system.

Position	Player	Points
1	(Argentina) Jorge Monroy	241,176
2	(Argentina) Sergio Acevedo	235,267
3	(Argentina) Clodomiro Carranza	163,142
4	(Argentina) Francisco Bidé	162,645
5	(Argentina) César Costilla	135,332

== See also ==
- 2016 PGA Tour Latinoamérica Developmental Series
