= 2017 TPG Tour =

Golf tour season

2017 TPG Tour season
- Duration: 8 February 2017 – 2 December 2017
- Number of official events: 12
- Most wins: (Argentina) Clodomiro Carranza (2) (Argentina) César Costilla (2)
- Order of Merit: (Argentina) César Costilla

The 2017 TPG Tour was the 11th season of the TPG Tour, the main professional golf tour in Argentina since it was formed in 2007.

== Schedule ==
The following table lists official events during the 2017 season.

Date	Tournament	Location	Purse (Arg$)	Winner (Note: The number in brackets after each winner's name is the number of TPG Tour events they had won up to and including that tournament.)
11 Feb	Abierto del Sur	Buenos Aires	550,000	(Argentina) Marcos Montenegro (1)
5 Mar	Buenos Aires Classic	Buenos Aires	320,000	(Argentina) Clodomiro Carranza (4)
2 Apr	Abierto Norpatagónico	Buenos Aires	550,000	(Argentina) Maximiliano Godoy (4)
13 May	Abierto del Norte	Salta	550,000	(Argentina) César Costilla (5)
19 Jun	Abierto de La Rioja	La Rioja	250,000	(Argentina) Gustavo Acosta (2)
23 Jun	Abierto Termas de Río Hondo	Santiago del Estero	250,000	(Argentina) Jorge Monroy (5)
8 Jul	Abierto de Misiones	Misiones	400,000	(Argentina) César Costilla (6)
26 Aug	Abierto Internacional de Golf AguaVista	Paraguay	US$30,000	(Argentina) Clodomiro Carranza (5)
30 Sep	Gran Premio Los Pingüinos	Buenos Aires	300,000	(Argentina) Julio Zapata (7)
7 Oct	Carlos Franco Invitational	Paraguay	US$40,000	(Argentina) Franco Romero (1)
26 Nov	Andrés Romero Invitational	Buenos Aires	600,000	(Argentina) Augusto Núñez (1)
2 Dec	Abierto del Litoral	Santa Fe	550,000	(Argentina) Sebastián Bergagna (1)

== Order of Merit ==
The Order of Merit was based on tournament results during the season, calculated using a points-based system.

Position	Player	Points
1	(Argentina) César Costilla	355,581
2	(Argentina) Clodomiro Carranza	314,896
3	(Argentina) Franco Romero	207,710
4	(Argentina) Jorge Monroy	187,748
5	(Argentina) Maximiliano Godoy	172,953

== See also ==
- 2017 PGA Tour Latinoamérica Developmental Series
