= 2026 TPG Tour =

Golf tour season

2026 TPG Tour season
- Duration: 22 January 2026 – 12 December 2026
- Number of official events: 13

The 2026 TPG Tour is the 20th season of the TPG Tour, the main professional golf tour in Argentina since it was formed in 2007.

== Schedule ==
The following table lists official events during the 2026 season.

Date	Tournament	Location	Purse (Arg$)	Winner (Note: The number in brackets after each winner's name is the number of TPG Tour events they had won up to and including that tournament.)
25 Jan	Abierto del Sur	Buenos Aires	60,000,000	(Argentina) Mauro Báez (2)
22 Mar	Abierto Internacional del Este	Uruguay	US$40,000	(Argentina) Mateo Pulcini (a) (1)
5 Apr	Abierto de General Pico	La Pampa	30,000,000	(Argentina) Andrés Gallegos (8)
11 Apr	Abierto Norpatagónico	Buenos Aires	60,000,000	(Argentina) Santiago Bauni (4)
9 May	Abierto del Norte	Tucumán	60,000,000	(Argentina) Augusto Núñez (5)
4 Jul	Abierto Termas de Río Hondo	Tucumán	60,000,000	(Brazil) Andrey Borges (1)
25 Sep	Andrés Romero Invitational	Santiago del Estero	50,000,000	(Argentina) Jesús Montenegro (1)
4 Oct	Abierto del Oeste	Mendoza	60,000,000	(Argentina) Segundo Oliva Pinto (a) (1)
8 Nov	YPF Neuquén Invitational	Neuquén	60,000,000	(Argentina) Fabián Gómez (13)
14 Nov	Buenos Aires Classic	Buenos Aires	32,000,000	(Argentina) Fabián Gómez (14)
21 Nov	Abierto del Litoral	Santa Fe	80,000,000	
29 Nov	Argentine PGA Championship	Buenos Aires	60,000,000	
12 Dec	Tucumán Invitational	Buenos Aires	30,000,000	
