= 2015 TPG Tour =

Golf tour season

2015 TPG Tour season
- Duration: 5 February 2015 – 13 December 2015
- Number of official events: 7
- Order of Merit: (Argentina) Clodomiro Carranza

The 2015 TPG Tour was the ninth season of the TPG Tour, the main professional golf tour in Argentina since it was formed in 2007.

== Schedule ==
The following table lists official events during the 2015 season.

Date	Tournament	Location	Purse (Arg$)	Winner (Note: The number in brackets after each winner's name is the number of TPG Tour events they had won up to and including that tournament.)
8 Feb	Abierto del Sur	Buenos Aires	450,000	(Argentina) Francisco Bidé (1)
11 Apr	Abierto Norpatagónico	Buenos Aires	450,000	(Argentina) Emilio Domínguez (3)
14 Jun	Abierto Termas de Río Hondo	Santiago del Estero	350,000	(Argentina) Maximiliano Godoy (2)
24 Oct	Gran Premio Los Pingüinos	Buenos Aires	200,000	(Argentina) José Cóceres (2)
29 Nov	Abierto del Litoral	Santa Fe	450,000	(Argentina) Rafael Gómez (9)
6 Dec	Andrés Romero Invitational	Tucumán	400,000	(Argentina) Jorge Monroy (3)
13 Dec	Gran Premio Memorial Guillermo Daniel Ibañez	Buenos Aires	450,000	(Argentina) Miguel Rodríguez (5)

== Order of Merit ==
The Order of Merit was based on tournament results during the season, calculated using a points-based system.

Position	Player	Points
1	(Argentina) Clodomiro Carranza	150,107
2	(Argentina) Rafael Gómez	147,719
3	(Argentina) Jorge Monroy	127,481
4	(Argentina) Emilio Domínguez	122,546
5	(Argentina) Miguel Rodríguez	109,695

== See also ==
- 2015 PGA Tour Latinoamérica Developmental Series
