= 2014 TPG Tour =

Golf tour season

2014 TPG Tour season
- Duration: 8 January 2014 – 20 December 2014
- Number of official events: 10
- Most wins: (Argentina) Nelson Ledesma (2) (Argentina) Andrés Romero (2)
- Order of Merit: (Argentina) Nelson Ledesma

The 2014 TPG Tour was the eighth season of the TPG Tour, the main professional golf tour in Argentina since it was formed in 2007.

== Schedule ==
The following table lists official events during the 2014 season.

Date	Tournament	Location	Purse (Arg$)	Winner (Note: The number in brackets after each winner's name is the number of TPG Tour events they had won up to and including that tournament.)
11 Jan	Abierto del Sur	Buenos Aires	315,000	(Argentina) Nelson Ledesma (4)
12 Apr	Abierto Norpatagónico	Buenos Aires	400,000	(Argentina) Sebastián Saavedra (2)
8 Jun	Abierto Termas de Río Hondo	Santiago del Estero	270,000	(Argentina) Nelson Ledesma (5)
14 Sep	Copa Samsung Carlos Franco Invitational	Paraguay	US$40,000	(Argentina) Andrés Romero (8)
20 Sep	Andrés Romero Invitational	Tucumán	400,000	(Argentina) Jorge Monroy (2)
12 Oct	Abierto de Misiones	Misiones	280,000	(Argentina) César Costilla (4)
9 Nov	Gran Premio Los Pingüinos	Buenos Aires	200,000	(Argentina) Andrés Romero (9)
23 Nov	Abierto del Litoral	Santa Fe	425,000	(Argentina) Miguel Ángel Carballo (1)
7 Dec	Gran Premio Memorial Guillermo Daniel Ibañez	Buenos Aires	300,000	(Argentina) Sergio Acevedo (2)
20 Dec	Tour Argentino Championship	Tucumán	360,000	(Argentina) Mauricio Molina (4)

== Order of Merit ==
The Order of Merit was based on tournament results during the season, calculated using a points-based system.

Position	Player	Points
1	(Argentina) Nelson Ledesma	184,058
2	(Argentina) Jorge Monroy	136,482
3	(Argentina) Sergio Acevedo	119,829
4	(Argentina) César Costilla	116,535
5	(Argentina) Andrés Romero	106,555

== See also ==
- 2014 PGA Tour Latinoamérica Developmental Series
