= 2020 TPG Tour =

Golf tour season

2020 TPG Tour season
- Duration: 19 December 2019 – 20 December 2020
- Number of official events: 4
- Order of Merit: (Argentina) Andrés Gallegos

The 2020 TPG Tour was the 14th season of the TPG Tour, the main professional golf tour in Argentina since it was formed in 2007.

== Schedule ==
The following table lists official events during the 2020 season.

Date	Tournament	Location	Purse (Arg$)	Winner (Note: The number in brackets after each winner's name is the number of TPG Tour events they had won up to and including that tournament.)
21 Dec	Abierto Ituzaingó Golf Centenario	Buenos Aires	600,000	(Argentina) César Costilla (9)
26 Jan	Abierto del Sur	Buenos Aires	1,200,000	(Argentina) Jorge Fernández-Valdés (1)
15 Mar	Abierto Norpatagónico	Buenos Aires	1,200,000	(Argentina) Andrés Gallegos (1) (Argentina) Ricardo González (8)
20 Dec	Abierto Latinoamérica	Buenos Aires	500,000	(Argentina) Rafael Gómez (10)

== Order of Merit ==
The Order of Merit was based on tournament results during the season, calculated using a points-based system.

Position	Player	Points
1	(Argentina) Andrés Gallegos	276,000
2	(Argentina) Jorge Fernández-Valdés	238,200
3	(Argentina) César Costilla	213,500
4	(Argentina) Ricardo González	197,500
5	(Argentina) Paulo Pinto	112,560

== See also ==
- 2020–21 PGA Tour Latinoamérica Developmental Series
