= Fabián Gómez =

Argentine professional golfer

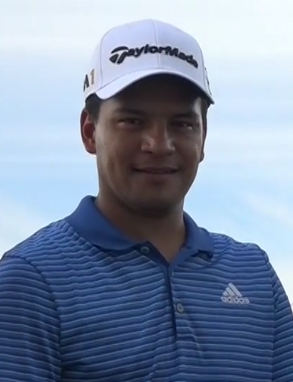

Personal information
- Full name: Fabián Eduardo Gòmez
- Nationality: Argentina
- Born: 27 October 1978 (age 48) Chaco, Argentina
- Height: 1.73 m (5 ft 8 in)
- Weight: 73 kg (161 lb; 11.5 st)

Career
- Sport: Golf
- Turned professional: 2001
- Current tours: PGA Tour; TPG Tour
- Former tours: Korn Ferry Tour; PGA Tour Latinoamérica; Tour de las Américas
- Professional wins: 23
- Highest ranking: 54 (21 February 2016)

Number of wins by tour
- PGA Tour: 2
- Korn Ferry Tour: 1
- Other: 20

Best results in major championships
- Masters Tournament: CUT: 2016
- PGA Championship: CUT: 2015, 2016
- U.S. Open: T70: 2021
- The Open Championship: CUT: 2016

Fabián Eduardo Gómez (born 27 October 1978) is an Argentine professional golfer who has played on a number of the world's golf tours including the PGA Tour, Nationwide Tour, PGA Tour Latinoamérica and the Tour de las Américas.

== Career ==
Gómez was born in Resistencia, Argentina. He has had three wins on the Tour de las Americas, in addition to three other wins on the Argentine TPG Tour. He placed second at the Chaco Open in 2006, the TLA Players Championship in 2006 and the Venezuela Open in 2007. He won TPG Tour Ranking in 2009.

Gómez won his first Nationwide Tour event at the 2010 Chitimacha Louisiana Open with a six stroke victory over the field which culminated in a final round 64. He finished the year 12th on the money list to earn his 2011 PGA Tour card. In 2011, Gómez played in 26 events with his best finish being a T7 at the Puerto Rico Open, his only top 10 that year. is other best results included a T15 at the St. Jude Classic and a T18 at the Viking Classic on his way to finishing the year 157th on the money list, hence failing to retain his playing privileges.

In 2012, Gómez returned to the Nationwide Tour, where his most notable results were a T2 at the Chitimacha Louisiana Open, T7 at the South Georgia Classic and T10 at the Winn-Dixie Jacksonville Open. He finished the year 55th on the Nationwide Tour money list. At the end of the season, he competed in the PGA Tour Qualifying Tournament where he placed T10 at 21 under par, which was enough to regain his PGA Tour card for the 2013 season.

In 2013, Gómez finished T2 at the Puerto Rico Open, T16 at the RBC Canadian Open and T21 at the AT&T National, but made only 10 cuts out of 23 events on the year. He finished 133rd on the FedEx Cup standings, so he lost his full PGA Tour card and only maintained conditional status.

On the 2014 Web.com Tour, Gómez finished T2 at the Stonebrae Classic, T4 at the United Leasing Championship and T10 at the Albertsons Boise Open. He finished 23rd in the regular season earnings, which earned him a PGA Tour card for the 2015 season.

On 14 June 2015, Gómez broke through and won his first PGA Tour title in his 70th event, at the FedEx St. Jude Classic, winning by four strokes over Greg Owen. He started the final round with the co-lead, alongside Owen, but shot a final round 66, which included five birdies and only one bogey to pull clear of the chasing pack and take the victory. The win moved Gómez up over 150 places in the world rankings to 131st and will ensure that he plays in his first ever major championship at the 2015 PGA Championship.

In January 2016, Gómez won his second PGA Tour title at the Sony Open in Hawaii. He prevailed in a sudden-death playoff over Brandt Snedeker with a birdie on the second extra hole. Gómez had earlier shot a 62 during the final round to come from four behind to make the playoff. It moved Gómez to the cusp of the world's top 50, at 55th and took him one step closer to representing Argentina in the summer Olympics.

Gómez also played occasionally on PGA Tour Latinoamérica when the tour is in Argentina, where he won the Personal Classic from 2013 to 2015.

== Professional wins (23) ==
=== PGA Tour wins (2) ===
No.	Date	Tournament	Winning score	Margin of victory	Runner-up
1	14 Jun 2015	FedEx St. Jude Classic	−13 (66-68-67-66=267)	4 strokes	(England) Greg Owen
2	17 Jan 2016	Sony Open in Hawaii	−20 (69-64-65-62=260)	Playoff	(United States) Brandt Snedeker

PGA Tour playoff record (1–0)

No.	Year	Tournament	Opponent	Result
1	2016	Sony Open in Hawaii	(United States) Brandt Snedeker	Won with birdie on second extra hole

=== Nationwide Tour wins (1) ===
No.	Date	Tournament	Winning score	Margin of victory	Runners-up
1	28 Mar 2010	Chitimacha Louisiana Open	−15 (70-68-67-64=269)	6 strokes	(United States) Scott Gutschewski, (United States) Kyle Reifers, (United States) Brian Vranesh

Nationwide Tour playoff record (0–1)

No.	Year	Tournament	Opponent	Result
1	2009	BMW Charity Pro-Am	(Australia) Michael Sim	Lost to par on first extra hole

=== Canadian Tour wins (1) ===
No.	Date	Tournament	Winning score	Margin of victory	Runner-up
1	7 Dec 2008 (2009 season)	Torneo de Maestros^{1}	−13 (69-71-64-67=271)	2 strokes	(Argentina) Andrés Romero

^{1}Co-sanctioned by the Tour de las Américas and the TPG Tour

=== PGA Tour Latinoamérica wins (3) ===
No.	Date	Tournament	Winning score	Margin of victory	Runner-up
1	1 Dec 2013	Personal Classic	−19 (67-69-66-67=269)	2 strokes	(Chile) Cristián Espinoza
2	1 Dec 2014	Personal Classic (2)	−24 (65-65-62=192) (Note: Shortened to 54 holes due to weather.)	7 strokes	(Argentina) Gustavo Acosta
3	15 Nov 2015	Personal Classic (3)	−16 (73-61-69-69=272)	3 strokes	(United States) Kent Bulle

=== Tour de las Américas wins (4) ===
No.	Date	Tournament	Winning score	Margin of victory	Runner-up
1	4 Jun 2006	Siemens Venezuela Open	−15 (68-65-68-64=265)	2 strokes	(Argentina) Miguel Guzmán
2	7 Dec 2008	Torneo de Maestros^{1,2}	−13 (69-71-64-67=271)	2 strokes	(Argentina) Andrés Romero
3	19 Apr 2009	Abierto del Centro^{2}	−11 (72-67-66-68=273)	4 strokes	(Argentina) Ricardo González
4	22 Nov 2009	Roberto De Vicenzo Classic^{2}	−9 (71-71-68-69=279)	2 strokes	(Argentina) Sebastián Fernández

^{1}Co-sanctioned by the Canadian Tour
^{2}Co-sanctioned by the TPG Tour

=== TPG Tour wins (14) ===
No.	Date	Tournament	Winning score	Margin of victory	Runner(s)-up
1	29 Apr 2007	Abierto del Nordeste	−8 (70-71-66-69=276)	1 stroke	(Argentina) Miguel Fernández
2	7 Dec 2008	Torneo de Maestros^{1,2}	−13 (69-71-64-67=271)	2 strokes	(Argentina) Andrés Romero
3	8 Mar 2009	Abierto Norpatagónico	−13 (64-68-69-66=267)	1 stroke	(Argentina) Clodomiro Carranza
4	19 Apr 2009	Abierto del Centro^{2}	−11 (72-67-66-68=273)	4 strokes	(Argentina) Ricardo González
5	22 Nov 2009	Roberto De Vicenzo Classic^{2}	−9 (71-71-68-69=279)	2 strokes	(Argentina) Sebastián Fernández
6	17 Jan 2010 (2009 season)	Abierto de la Provincia	+5 (76-75-73-69=293)	1 stroke	(Argentina) César Costilla, (Argentina) Manuel García
7	4 Dec 2016	Andrés Romero Invitational	−13 (68-66-69=203)	3 strokes	(Argentina) Miguel Ángel Carballo, (Argentina) Julián Lerda
8	14 Oct 2023	Andrés Romero Invitational (2)	−13 (69-67-70=206)	2 strokes	(Argentina) César Costilla, (Argentina) Leonardo Ledesma
9	1 Sep 2024	Nelson Ledesma Invitational	−11 (65-66=131)	3 strokes	(Argentina) Augusto Núñez
10	31 Aug 2025	Abierto de Chaco	−18 (61-66-70-69=266)	2 strokes	(Argentina) Franco Romero
11	15 Nov 2025	Buenos Aires Classic	−14 (64-66=130)	2 strokes	(Argentina) Diego Prone, (Paraguay) Gustavo Silvero
12	29 Nov 2025	Abierto del Litoral	−22 (67-62-67-66=262)	5 strokes	(Argentina) Ricardo González
13	8 Nov 2026	YPF Neuquén Invitational	−5 (70-72-73-68=283)	Playoff	(Argentina) Jesús Montenegro
14	14 Nov 2026	Buenos Aires Classic (2)	−13 (65-66=131)	Playoff	(Argentina) Andrés Gallegos

^{1}Co-sanctioned by the Canadian Tour
^{2}Co-sanctioned by the Tour de las Américas

=== Argentine Tour wins (1) ===
- 2004 Villa Mercedes Grand Prix

=== Gateway Tour wins (1) ===
No.	Date	Tournament	Winning score	Margin of victory	Runner-up
1	30 Jun 2006	Beach Summer 4	−21 (65-66-62-64=267)	1 stroke	(United States) Jeremy Pope

== Results in major championships ==
Results not in chronological order in 2020.

Tournament	2015	2016	2017	2018
Masters Tournament		CUT		
U.S. Open				
The Open Championship		CUT		
PGA Championship	CUT	CUT		

Tournament	2019	2020	2021
Masters Tournament			
PGA Championship			
U.S. Open			T70
The Open Championship		NT	

Did not play

CUT = missed the half-way cut
"T" = Tied
NT = No tournament due to COVID-19 pandemic

== Results in The Players Championship ==
Tournament	2016	2017
The Players Championship	T74	CUT

CUT = missed the halfway cut
"T" indicates a tie for a place

== Results in World Golf Championships ==
Tournament	2015	2016
Championship		58
Match Play		T51
Invitational	T67	T46
Champions		

Did not play

"T" = Tied

== Team appearances ==
Professional

- World Cup (representing Argentina): 2013

== See also ==
- 2010 Nationwide Tour graduates
- 2012 PGA Tour Qualifying School graduates
- 2014 Web.com Tour Finals graduates
- 2018 Web.com Tour Finals graduates
- 2019 Korn Ferry Tour Finals graduates
