= Estanislao Goya =

Argentine professional golfer (born 1988)

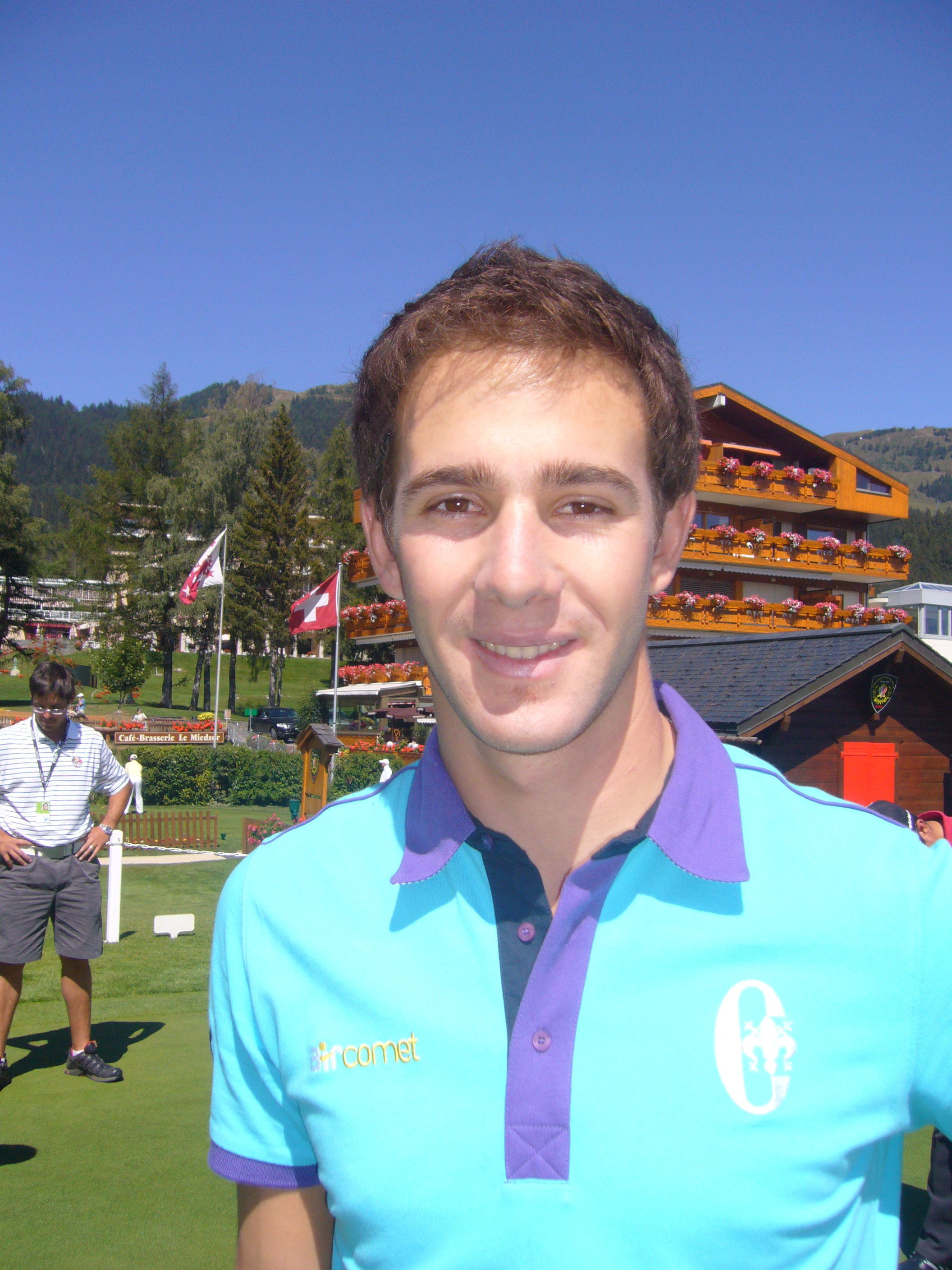

Personal information
- Full name: Carlos Estanislao Goya
- Nickname: Tano
- Nationality: Argentina
- Born: 1 June 1988 (age 38) Alta Gracia, Córdoba, Argentina
- Height: 1.83 m (6 ft 0 in)
- Weight: 185 lb (84 kg; 13.2 st)
- Spouse: Henni Zuël (m. 2015; div. 2018) Ana Paula Valdes (m. 2025)

Career
- Sport: Golf
- Turned professional: 2007
- Current tour: Korn Ferry Tour
- Former tours: PGA Tour; European Tour; Challenge Tour; PGA Tour Latinoamérica
- Professional wins: 8
- Highest ranking: 98 (29 March 2009)

Number of wins by tour
- European Tour: 1
- Sunshine Tour: 1
- Challenge Tour: 3
- Other: 3

Best results in major championships
- Masters Tournament: DNP
- PGA Championship: DNP
- U.S. Open: CUT: 2013
- The Open Championship: CUT: 2010, 2013

Achievements and awards
- Tour de las Américas Order of Merit winner: 2008
- TPG Tour Order of Merit winner: 2008

Carlos Estanislao "Tano" Goya (born 1 June 1988) is an Argentine professional golfer.

== Career ==
In 2007, Goya turned professional. He won the Tour de las Americas qualifying school by nine shots, and followed that with victory in the first event of the 2008 season, the Challenge Tour co-sanctioned Center Open, and third place in the Argentine Open. He went on to finish top of the Order of Merit that year.

That first win also gave Goya Challenge Tour membership, and he finished the season by winning the Apulia San Domenico Grand Final, which lifted him to fifth in that tours final standings, gaining exemption to the full European Tour for 2009. He won the TPG Tour Order of Merit in 2008.

In March 2009, in only his sixth start on the European Tour, Goya won the Madeira Islands Open BPI – Portugal, earning him full exemption on the tour until the end of 2010. Goya couldn't follow up his European Tour win and won a Challenge Tour event in 2017.

In 2014, Goya won the Dimension Data Pro-Am on the Sunshine Tour.

== Personal life ==
In 2016, he married former professional golfer Henni Zuël; they divorced in 2018. In 2025, he married former Mexican professional golfer Ana Paula Valdes.

== Professional wins (7) ==
=== European Tour wins (1) ===
No.	Date	Tournament	Winning score	Margin of victory	Runner-up
1	22 Mar 2009	Madeira Islands Open BPI - Portugal	−6 (68-68-69-73=278)	1 stroke	(Scotland) Callum Macaulay

=== Sunshine Tour wins (1) ===
No.	Date	Tournament	Winning score	Margin of victory	Runners-up
1	23 Feb 2014	Dimension Data Pro-Am	−14 (73-67-67-68=275)	1 stroke	(Denmark) Lucas Bjerregaard, (Brazil) Adilson da Silva, (South Africa) Keith Horne, (South Africa) Jean Hugo

=== Challenge Tour wins (3) ===
Legend
Tour Championships (1)
Other Challenge Tour (2)

No.	Date	Tournament	Winning score	Margin of victory	Runner(s)-up
1	30 Mar 2008	Abierto Visa del Centro^{1}	−12 (71-67-68-66=272)	Playoff	(England) Gary Boyd
2	25 Oct 2008	Apulia San Domenico Grand Final	−17 (67-69-65-66=267)	1 stroke	(England) Richard Bland, (England) John E. Morgan
3	30 Jul 2017	Swedish Challenge	−16 (69-69-69-65=272)	3 strokes	(United States) Sihwan Kim, (Sweden) Mikael Lundberg

^{1}Co-sanctioned by the Tour de las Américas and the TPG Tour

Challenge Tour playoff record (1–0)

No.	Year	Tournament	Opponent	Result
1	2008	Abierto Visa del Centro	(England) Gary Boyd	Won with birdie on first extra hole

=== Tour de las Américas wins (1) ===
No.	Date	Tournament	Winning score	Margin of victory	Runner-up
1	30 Mar 2008	Abierto Visa del Centro^{1}	−12 (71-67-68-66=272)	Playoff	(England) Gary Boyd

^{1}Co-sanctioned by the Challenge Tour and the TPG Tour

=== TPG Tour wins (3) ===
No.	Date	Tournament	Winning score	Margin of victory	Runner-up
1	30 Mar 2008	Abierto Visa del Centro^{1}	−12 (71-67-68-66=272)	Playoff	(England) Gary Boyd
2	17 Dec 2011	Ángel Cabrera Classic	−18 (65-69-68-68=270)	9 strokes	(Argentina) Ángel Monguzzi
3	17 Feb 2019	Abierto del Sur	−15 (67-67-64-67=265)	6 strokes	(Argentina) Julio Zapata

^{1}Co-sanctioned by the Challenge Tour and the Tour de las Américas

=== Other wins (1) ===
- 2008 DeVicenzo Shootout (Argentina)

== Results in major championships ==
Tournament	2010	2011	2012	2013
Masters Tournament				
U.S. Open				CUT
The Open Championship	CUT			CUT
PGA Championship				

Did not play

CUT = missed the half-way cut
"T" indicates a tie for a place

== Results in World Golf Championships ==
Tournament	2014
Match Play	
Championship	
Invitational	72
Champions	

Did not play

== Team appearances ==
Amateur

- Eisenhower Trophy (representing Argentina): 2006
- Vigil Cup (Argentine): 2007 (team and individual winner)

Professional

- World Cup (representing Argentina): 2009

== See also ==
- 2008 Challenge Tour graduates
- 2012 European Tour Qualifying School graduates
- 2013 European Tour Qualifying School graduates
- 2022 Korn Ferry Tour Finals graduates
