= Ángel Cabrera Classic =

The Ángel Cabrera Classic was a golf tournament on the TPG Tour, the official professional golf tour in Argentina. It was held at the Jockey Club Córdoba, in Córdoba Province.

== Winners ==
Year	Winner	Score	To par	Margin of victory	Runner-up	Ref
2011	(Argentina) Estanislao Goya	270	−18	9 strokes	(Argentina) Ángel Monguzzi	
2009–2010: No tournament
2008	(Argentina) César Monasterio	202	−8	Playoff	(Argentina) Andrés Romero	
2007	(Argentina) Rafael Gómez	269	−11	1 stroke	(Argentina) Daniel Barbetti (Argentina) Daniel Vancsik	
