= Daniel Vancsik =

Argentine former golfer and politician (born 1977)

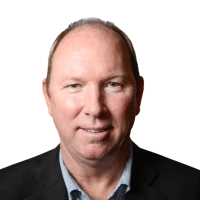

Personal information
- Nickname: Colo
- Nationality: Argentina
- Born: 7 January 1977 (age 49) Posadas, Argentina
- Height: 1.87 m (6 ft 2 in)
- Weight: 90 kg (198 lb; 14 st 2 lb)

Career
- Sport: Golf
- Turned professional: 1997
- Former tours: European Tour; Challenge Tour; Tour de las Américas; TPG Tour
- Professional wins: 12

Number of wins by tour
- European Tour: 2
- Challenge Tour: 3
- Other: 7

National Deputy
- Incumbent
- Assumed office 10 December 2023
- Constituency: Misiones

Personal details
- Party: Party of Social Concord

Daniel "Colo" Vancsik (born 7 January 1977) is an Argentine politician and former professional golfer. He won twice on the European Tour.

== Early life ==
Vancsik was born in Posadas, Argentina. He started playing the game when he was 12 at the Tacuru Club in Posadas-Misiones-Argentina.

== Professional career ==
Vancsik turned professional in 1997 and has played in Europe since 2003, initially on the second tier Challenge Tour, on which he won three tournaments, and later on the main European Tour. His collected his first win on the European Tour at the 2007 Madeira Islands Open BPI.

In May 2009, he won the BMW Italian Open in Turin, beating John Daly, Raphaël Jacquelin and Robert Rock by six shots.

Since 2023, he has been a member of the Argentine Chamber of Deputies elected in Misiones Province for the Party of Social Concord, sitting in the "Federal Innovation" bloc.

== Professional wins (12) ==
=== European Tour wins (2) ===
No.	Date	Tournament	Winning score	Margin of victory	Runners-up
1	25 Mar 2007	Madeira Islands Open BPI	−18 (68-66-68-68=270)	7 strokes	(South Africa) David Frost, (Spain) Santiago Luna
2	10 May 2009	BMW Italian Open	−17 (68-65-69-65=267)	6 strokes	(United States) John Daly, (France) Raphaël Jacquelin, (England) Robert Rock

=== Challenge Tour wins (3) ===
No.	Date	Tournament	Winning score	Margin of victory	Runner-up
1	9 Feb 2003	Telefónica Centro America Abierto de Guatemala^{1}	−10 (68-68-70-68=274)	Playoff	(Argentina) Juan Abbate
2	29 Feb 2004	Abierto Telefónica^{1} (2)	−16 (65-73-65-69=272)	2 strokes	(Paraguay) Marco Ruiz
3	13 Mar 2005	Tusker Kenya Open	−8 (66-68-75-63=272)	3 strokes	(South Africa) Michael Kirk

^{1}Co-sanctioned by the Tour de las Américas

Challenge Tour playoff record (1–0)

No.	Year	Tournament	Opponent	Result
1	2003	Telefónica Centro America Abierto de Guatemala	(Argentina) Juan Abbate	Won with birdie on first extra hole

=== Tour de las Américas wins (2) ===
No.	Date	Tournament	Winning score	Margin of victory	Runner-up
1	9 Feb 2003	Telefónica Centro America Abierto de Guatemala^{1}	−10 (68-68-70-68=274)	Playoff	(Argentina) Juan Abbate
2	29 Feb 2004	Abierto Telefónica^{1} (2)	−16 (65-73-65-69=272)	2 strokes	(Paraguay) Marco Ruiz

^{1}Co-sanctioned by the Challenge Tour

=== TPG Tour wins (2) ===
No.	Date	Tournament	Winning score	Margin of victory	Runner(s)-up
1	17 Apr 2011	Copa Juan José Luis Galli (with (Argentina) Joaquín Estévez)	−18 (62-75-64=201)	1 stroke	(Argentina) Gustavo Acosta and (Argentina) Julio Zapata
2	5 Nov 2016	Gran Premio Los Pingüinos	−15 (64-65=129)	3 strokes	(Argentina) Paulo Pinto

=== Other wins (5) ===
- 2000 Pinamar Open (Arg), Rio Cuarto Open (Arg)
- 2003 Viña del Mar Open (Arg)
- 2006 Carilo Open (Arg)
- 2009 Juan Jose Galli Cup (Arg) (with Joaquín Estévez)

== Results in World Golf Championships ==
Tournament	2009
Match Play	
Championship	
Invitational	
Champions	T70

Did not play

"T" = Tied

== See also ==
- 2005 Challenge Tour graduates
- 2006 European Tour Qualifying School graduates
