= Tandil Open =

The Tandil Open was a golf tournament on the TPG Tour, the official professional golf tour in Argentina. First held in 2006, it was always held at the Valle de Tandil Golf Club, in Tandil, Buenos Aires Province.

== Winners ==
Year	Winner	Score	Runner(s)-up
Golf Play Classic
2008	(Argentina) Leonardo Machado	284 (E)^{PO}	Gustavo Acosta, Cesar Costilla
Personal Classic
2007	(Argentina) Diego Ortiz	277 (−7)	Paulo Pinto
2006	(Argentina) Julio Zapata	279 (−5)	Ernesto Rivas

^{PO} – won following playoff
