= Parana Open =

Golf tournament

The Parana Open, or the Mesopotamia Open, was a golf tournament on the TPG Tour, the official professional golf tour in Argentina. First held in 1986, it has always been held at the Estudiantes de Paraná Golf Club in Paraná, Entre Ríos Province. This course hosted the Juan Jose Galli Four Ball Professional Cup from 2009 to 2011.

The tournament not held from 1988 to 1997, 2001, 2002 and 2004.

== Winners ==
Year	Winner	Runner-up
Juan Jose Galli Four Ball Professional Cup
2011	Daniel Vancsik and Joaquin Estevez	
2010	Agustin Jauretche and Manuel Relancio	
2009	Daniel Vancsik and Joaquin Estevez	
Parana Open
2008	Rafael Gómez	Cesar Costilla
2007	Julio Zapata	Juan I. Gil, Rubén Alvarez
2006	Ricardo González	Julio Zapata
2005	Miguel Fernández	Omar Reino
2004	no tournament	
2003*	Gustavo Piovano	
2001–02	no tournament	
2000	Julio Zapata	César Monasterio
1999	Esteban Isasi	
1998	Rubén Alvarez	
1988–97	No tournament	
1987	José Cantero	
1986	Vicente Fernández ^{PO}	Miguel Ángel Martín

^{PO} – won following playoff
* – tournament contested over 36 holes
