= Andrés Romero =

Argentine professional golfer (born 1981)

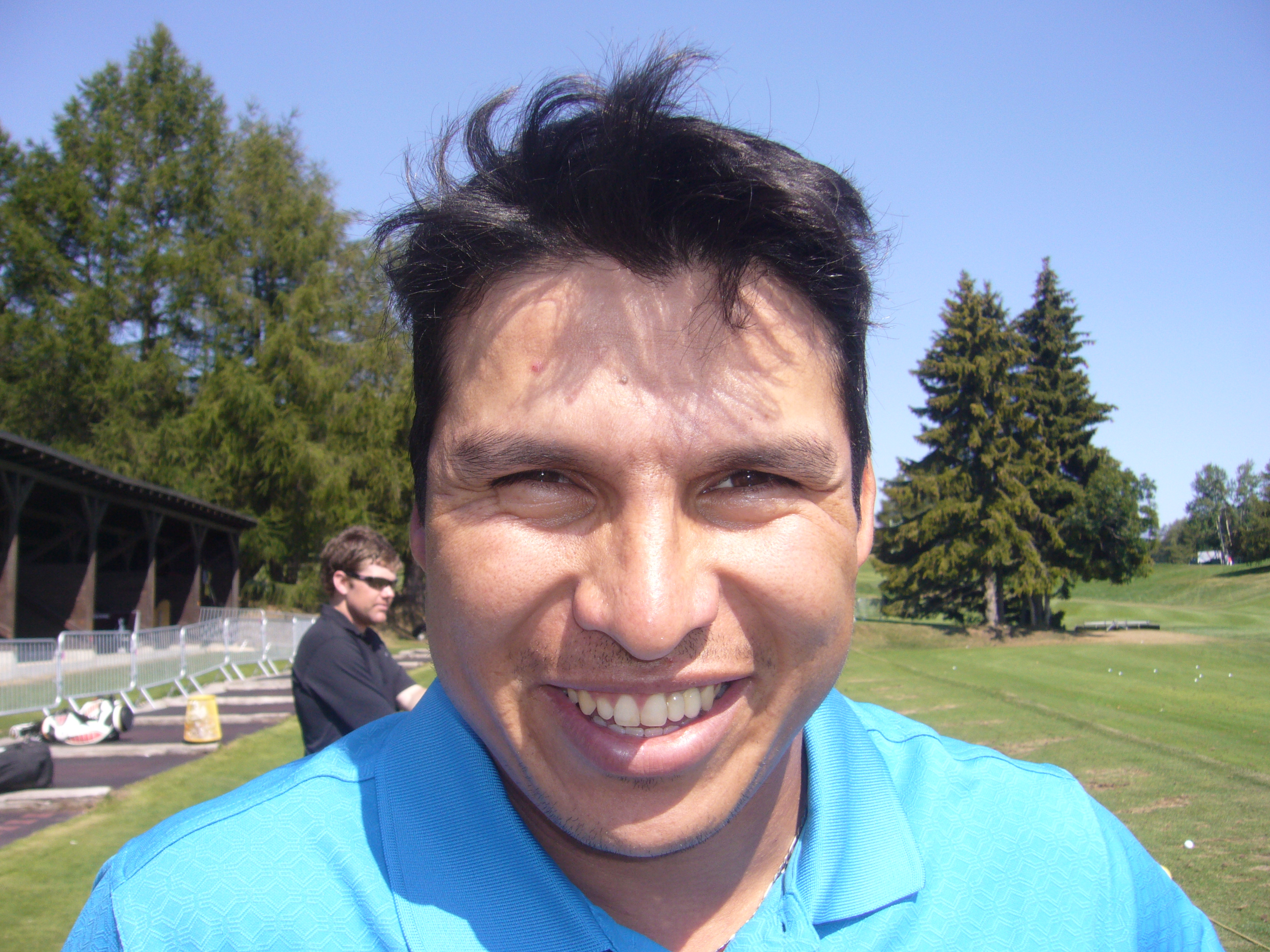

Personal information
- Full name: Andrés Fabián Romero
- Nicknames: Pigu, A-Bomb
- Nationality: Argentina
- Born: 8 May 1981 (age 45) Tucumán, Argentina
- Height: 1.78 m (5 ft 10 in)
- Weight: 66 kg (146 lb; 10.4 st)

Career
- Sport: Golf
- Turned professional: 1998
- Current tour: TPG Tour
- Former tours: PGA Tour; European Tour; Web.com Tour; Challenge Tour; Tour de las Américas
- Professional wins: 21
- Highest ranking: 21 (30 March 2008)

Number of wins by tour
- PGA Tour: 1
- European Tour: 2
- Challenge Tour: 1
- Other: 17

Best results in major championships
- Masters Tournament: T8: 2008
- PGA Championship: T7: 2008
- U.S. Open: T14: 2015
- The Open Championship: 3rd: 2007

Achievements and awards
- PGA Tour Rookie of the Year: 2008
- TPG Tour Order of Merit winner: 2010

Andrés Fabián Romero (born 8 May 1981) is an Argentine professional golfer who plays on both the PGA Tour and European Tour.

== Career ==
Romero was born in Tucumán. He won his European Tour card by finishing 14th on the Challenge Tour rankings in 2005. His rookie season included a tied for second finish at the Scottish Open and a tied for eighth finish in The Open Championship. Romero finished placed 35th on the Order of Merit.

In the 2007 Open Championship, Romero placed third, behind Sergio García and Pádraig Harrington, making ten birdies on the last day of play. He briefly led the field by two strokes, but made a double bogey on the 17th hole and a bogey on the 18th to miss a play-off by one shot. The following week he won his first European Tour event at the Deutsche Bank Players Championship of Europe. Romero finished the season in the top ten of the Order of Merit, in seventh position.

In July 2007, Romero broke into the top 100 of the Official World Golf Ranking for the first time and he reached a new best of 29th after his Players Championship of Europe win. The next week a top-10 finish in the WGC-Bridgestone Invitational took him into the top 25.

In March 2008, Romero won for the first time on the PGA Tour at the Zurich Classic of New Orleans, and moved to a career high of 21 in the rankings. In 2008 he overtook fellow Argentine Ángel Cabrera to become the highest ranked South American golfer for a short period until he was surpassed by Camilo Villegas of Colombia. He was named the 2008 PGA Tour Rookie of the Year, having three top-10 finishes including his win in New Orleans.

Romero finished runner-up at the 2012 Memorial Tournament, after shooting a final round 67 to get into contention. He finished two strokes behind Tiger Woods after Woods chipped in for birdie on the 16th hole to go clear of the field. Romero moved into the top 125 in the FedEx Cup standings and returned to the world's top 100 as a result. That year he was caddied at the final round of the Open Championship by footballer Carlos Tevez.

Romero broke his hand after punching a sign at the 2015 Barracuda Championship. He failed to meet the terms of his medical exemption and spent two years scratching for starts with only past champion status. In June 2017, he regained his European Tour membership when he won the BMW International Open on an sponsor's invitation. Romero fired a bogey free final round of 65, to come from three strokes behind and win by one stroke from three other players, ending a ten-year drought on the European Tour. The win vaulted Romero up over 650 places in the world rankings from 837th to 182nd.

== Professional wins (21) ==
=== PGA Tour wins (1) ===
No.	Date	Tournament	Winning score	Margin of victory	Runner-up
1	30 Mar 2008	Zurich Classic of New Orleans	−13 (73-69-65-68=275)	1 stroke	(Australia) Peter Lonard

=== European Tour wins (2) ===
No.	Date	Tournament	Winning score	Margin of victory	Runners-up
1	29 Jul 2007	Deutsche Bank Players Championship of Europe	−19 (68-68-63-70=269)	3 strokes	(Denmark) Søren Hansen, (England) Oliver Wilson
2	25 Jun 2017	BMW International Open	−17 (67-71-68-65=271)	1 stroke	(England) Richard Bland, (Belgium) Thomas Detry, (Spain) Sergio García

European Tour playoff record (0–1)

No.	Year	Tournament	Opponents	Result
1	2019	Omega European Masters	(Italy) Lorenzo Gagli, (Northern Ireland) Rory McIlroy, (Finland) Kalle Samooja, (Sweden) Sebastian Söderberg	Söderberg won with birdie on first extra hole

=== Challenge Tour wins (1) ===
No.	Date	Tournament	Winning score	Margin of victory	Runners-up
1	27 Aug 2005	Morson International Pro-Am Challenge	−9 (69-65-69-68=271)	1 stroke	(Wales) Sion Bebb, (England) Richard McEvoy, (Italy) Marco Soffietti

=== Tour de las Américas wins (7) ===
No.	Date	Tournament	Winning score	Margin of victory	Runner-up
1	26 Jan 2003	Cable and Wireless Panama Masters	−14 (66-70-72-66=274)	4 strokes	(Argentina) Juan Abbate
2	23 Nov 2003	Abierto de Medellín	−19 (70-68-66-65=269)	1 stroke	(Venezuela) Carlos Larraín
3	13 Nov 2005	Roberto De Vicenzo Classic^{1}	−11 (69-70-66=205)	4 strokes	(Argentina) Hernán Rey
4	5 Nov 2006	Torneo de Maestros^{1}	−9 (204) (Note: Shortened to 54 holes due to weather.)	3 strokes	(Argentina) Ángel Cabrera
5	16 Nov 2008	Abierto del Litoral^{2}	−12 (62-71-67-68=268)	3 strokes	(Argentina) Mauricio Molina
6	18 Apr 2010	Abierto del Centro^{2}	−10 (66-68-71-69=274)	4 strokes	(Argentina) Ángel Cabrera
7	5 Dec 2010	Torneo de Maestros^{2}	−13 (66-67-70-68=271)	5 strokes	(Argentina) Fabián Gómez

^{1}Co-sanctioned by the PGA of Argentina Tour
^{2}Co-sanctioned by the TPG Tour

=== TPG Tour wins (10) ===
No.	Date	Tournament	Winning score	Margin of victory	Runner-up
1	9 Jun 2007	Abierto del Norte	−19 (65-67-66-67=265)	Shared title with (Argentina) Ricardo González	
2	29 Sep 2007	Abierto de Salta	−14 (68-70-68-64=270)	1 stroke	(Argentina) Miguel Guzmán
3	17 May 2008	Abierto del Norte (2)	−20 (65-66-67-66=264)	2 strokes	(Argentina) Ángel Cabrera, (Argentina) Emiliano Grillo (a)
4	16 Nov 2008	Abierto del Litoral^{1}	−12 (62-71-67-68=268)	3 strokes	(Argentina) Mauricio Molina
5	18 Apr 2010	Abierto del Centro^{1}	−10 (66-68-71-69=274)	4 strokes	(Argentina) Ángel Cabrera
6	5 Dec 2010	Torneo de Maestros^{1}	−13 (66-67-70-68=271)	5 strokes	(Argentina) Fabián Gómez
7	13 Nov 2011	Gran Premio Los Pingüinos	−13 (64-70-69=203)	Playoff	(Argentina) Sergio Acevedo
8	14 Sep 2014	Copa Samsung Carlos Franco Invitational	−11 (70-67-71-69=277)	1 stroke	(Paraguay) Carlos Franco
9	9 Nov 2014	Gran Premio Los Pingüinos (2)	−11 (69-66-70=205)	3 strokes	(Argentina) Sergio Acevedo
10	17 Jun 2023	Abierto Termas de Río Hondo	−18 (70-69-66-69=274)	Playoff	(Argentina) Emilio Domínguez, (Argentina) Leandro Marelli

^{1}Co-sanctioned by the Tour de las Américas

=== Other wins (3) ===
- 2003 North Open
- 2006 North Open, Abierto del Litoral (Argentina)

== Results in major championships ==
Tournament	2006	2007	2008	2009	2010	2011	2012	2013	2014	2015	2016	2017
Masters Tournament			T8	T49								
U.S. Open			T36	T47						T14		CUT
The Open Championship	T8	3	T32	T13			83					
PGA Championship	CUT	CUT	T7	CUT		T45						

Top 10
Did not play

CUT = missed the half-way cut
"T" = tied

=== Summary ===
Tournament	Wins	2nd	3rd	Top-5	Top-10	Top-25	Events	Cuts made
Masters Tournament	0	0	0	0	1	1	2	2
U.S. Open	0	0	0	0	0	1	4	3
The Open Championship	0	0	1	1	2	3	5	5
PGA Championship	0	0	0	0	1	1	5	2
Totals	0	0	1	1	4	6	16	12

- Most consecutive cuts made – 7 (2008 Masters – 2009 Open Championship)
- Longest streak of top-10s – 1 (four times)

== Results in The Players Championship ==
Tournament	2008	2009	2010	2011	2012	2013	2014	2015
The Players Championship	CUT	CUT	T10	T39	CUT	T37	CUT	CUT

Top 10

CUT = missed the halfway cut
"T" indicates a tie for a place

== Results in World Golf Championships ==
Results not in chronological order prior to 2015.

Tournament	2007	2008	2009	2010	2011	2012	2013	2014	2015	2016	2017
Championship		T30	T46								
Match Play		R32	R64								
Invitational	T6	T63									70
Champions											

Top 10

QF, R16, R32, R64 = Round in which player lost in match play
"T" = tied
Note that the HSBC Champions did not become a WGC event until 2009.

== Team appearances ==
- World Cup (representing Argentina): 2006, 2007

== See also ==
- 2005 Challenge Tour graduates
