= San Luis Open (golf) =

Golf tournament in Argentina

The San Luis Open, or the Abierto de San Luis, is a golf tournament on the TPG Tour, the official professional golf tour in Argentina. First held in 2002, it has always been held at the Villa Mercedes Golf Club, in Villa Mercedes, San Luis Province. The tournament was included on the Tour de las Americas from 2006 to 2008.

== Winners ==
Year	Winner	Score	Runner-up
San Luis Open
2013	(Argentina) Julio Zapata	201 (−12)	Rafael Echenique, Mauricio Molina
2012	(Argentina) Julio Zapata	271 (−13)	Cesar Costilla
2009–11	No tournament		
2008	(Argentina) Rafael Gómez*	276 (−8)^{PO}	Walter Rodriguez
2007	(Argentina) Emilio Dominguez	279 (−5)	Rafael Gómez, Cesar Costilla
2006*	(Argentina) Rafael Gómez	195 (−18)	Eduardo Romero, Mark Tullo
Villa Mercedes Open
2005	No tournament		
2004	(Argentina) Fabián Gómez	132 (−8)^{PO}	Angel Monguzzi Jr
2003	(Argentina) Julio Zapata	136 (−4)	Jorge Carrizo
Villa Mercedes Grand Prix
2002	(Argentina) Horacio Carbonetti		

^{PO} – won following playoff
* – reduced to 54 holes because of rain
