= Rafael Gómez (golfer) =

Argentine golfer

Personal information
- Full name: Rafael Faustino Gómez
- Nationality: Argentina
- Born: 27 December 1967 (age 58) Buenos Aires, Argentina
- Height: 5 ft 10.5 in (1.79 m)
- Spouse: Sandra (m. 1994)
- Children: 2

Career
- Sport: Golf
- Turned professional: 1990
- Current tour: European Senior Tour
- Former tours: European Tour; Nationwide Tour; Canadian Tour; PGA Tour Latinoamérica; Tour de las Américas; TPG Tour
- Professional wins: 30

Number of wins by tour
- Challenge Tour: 2
- Other: 28

Achievements and awards
- Tour de las Américas Order of Merit winner: 2001–02, 2004
- TPG Tour Order of Merit winner: 2007

Rafael Faustino Gómez (born 27 December 1967) is an Argentine professional golfer.

== Career ==
In 1967, Gómez was born in Buenos Aires.

In 1990, Gómez turned professional. He played on the European Tour's developmental tour, the Challenge Tour, in 2003 and from 2005 to 2007. He played on the European Tour from 2005 to 2007. He played on the U.S.-based Nationwide Tour in 2004 and a few events on the PGA Tour. His best finish on the PGA Tour was 38th place in The International in 2002. His best finish on the European Tour was 22nd place in the KLM Open in 2006.

Gómez won the TPG Tour Order of Merit in 2007 and the Tour de las Americas Order of Merit in 2001/02 and 2004. He was second in Los Encinos Open in 2002, Mexican Open in 2006 and the Colombian Open in 2008. Gómez and Ángel Cabrera have the most tournament wins on the Tour de las Americas with eight victories.

Gómez won the 2018 European Senior Tour qualifying school and currently plays on that tour. He finished runner-up in the 2018 Senior Italian Open, losing in a playoff to American Clark Dennis.

== Professional wins (30) ==
=== Challenge Tour wins (2) ===
No.	Date	Tournament	Winning score	Margin of victory	Runner-up
1	28 Nov 2004 (2005 season)	Abierto Mexicano de Golf^{1}	−14 (67-70-68-65=270)	2 strokes	(Colombia) Eduardo Herrera
2	15 May 2005	Tessali-Metaponto Open di Puglia e Basilicata	−17 (71-67-66-63=267)	1 stroke	(Sweden) Johan Edfors

^{1}Co-sanctioned by the Tour de las Américas

=== Canadian Tour wins (2) ===
No.	Date	Tournament	Winning score	Margin of victory	Runner-up
1	30 Nov 2008 (2009 season)	Sport Frances Open^{1}	−11 (69-69-71-68=277)	1 stroke	(United States) Daniel Im
2	27 Sep 2009	Iberostar Riviera Maya Open	−12 (69-67-64-76=276)	1 stroke	(Mexico) Antonio Maldonado

^{1}Co-sanctioned by the Tour de las Américas

=== Tour de las Américas wins (8) ===
No.	Date	Tournament	Winning score	Margin of victory	Runner(s)-up
1	20 Jan 2002	Corona Caribbean Open	−10 (68-69-68-73=278)	3 strokes	(United States) Brian Quinn
2	17 Feb 2002	American Express Costa Rica Open	+5 (73-69-73-74=289)	Playoff	(Paraguay) Marco Ruiz
3	11 Jan 2003	Caribbean Open (2)	−13 (71-66-69-69=275)	3 strokes	(Jamaica) John Bloomfield
4	28 Nov 2004	Abierto Mexicano de Golf^{1}	−14 (67-70-68-65=270)	2 strokes	(Colombia) Eduardo Herrera
5	26 Nov 2006	Abierto de San Luis	−18 (64-67-66=195) (Note: Shortened to 54 holes due to weather.)	4 strokes	(Argentina) Eduardo Romero, (Chile) Mark Tullo
6	25 May 2008	Televisa Players Championship	−10 (64-66-70=200)	Playoff	(Venezuela) Raúl Sanz
7	9 Nov 2008	Abierto de San Luis^{2} (2)	−15 (71-72-71-62=276)	Playoff	(Argentina) Walter Rodríguez
8	30 Nov 2008	Sport Frances Open^{3}	−11 (69-69-71-68=277)	1 stroke	(United States) Daniel Im

^{1}Co-sanctioned by the Challenge Tour
^{2}Co-sanctioned by the TPG Tour
^{3}Co-sanctioned by the Canadian Tour

=== TPG Tour wins (11) ===
No.	Date	Tournament	Winning score	Margin of victory	Runner(s)-up
1	3 Mar 2007	Abierto del Sur	−14 (70-68-62-66=266)	1 stroke	(Argentina) Carlos Cardeza
2	22 Apr 2007	Ángel Cabrera Classic	−11 (69-69-68-63=269)	1 stroke	(Argentina) Daniel Barbetti
3	10 Feb 2008	Abierto de Cariló	−10 (71-70-70-71=282)	4 strokes	(Argentina) Mauricio Molina
4	16 Mar 2008	Abierto de la Mesopotamia	−15 (68-66-69-74=277)	4 strokes	(Argentina) César Costilla
5	9 Nov 2008	Abierto de San Luis^{1}	−15 (71-72-71-62=276)	Playoff	(Argentina) Walter Rodríguez
6	14 Nov 2010	Campeonato Metropolitano	−25 (66-65-66-66=263)	3 strokes	(Argentina) Sebastián Fernández
7	16 Jan 2011 (2010 season)	Buenos Aires Classic	−12 (73-69-70-68=280)	1 stroke	(Argentina) Tommy Cocha
8	6 Oct 2013	Argentine PGA Championship	−10 (70-70-68-70=278)	1 stroke	(Argentina) Gustavo Acosta, (Paraguay) Carlos Franco
9	29 Nov 2015	Abierto del Litoral	−12 (66-69-66-67=268)	2 strokes	(Argentina) Julián Etulain
10	20 Dec 2020	Abierto Latinoamérica	−5 (70-69=139)	4 strokes	(Argentina) Mateo Pulcini (a)
11	25 Nov 2023	Abierto de San Vicente	−12 (64-66=130)	3 strokes	(Argentina) Franco Romero

^{1}Co-sanctioned by the Tour de las Américas

=== Other Argentine wins (5) ===
- 1996 La Orquidea Grand Prix
- 1997 JPGA Championship
- 1998 Norpatagonico Open
- 2005 Pinamar Open
- 2008 Jose Jurado Grand Prix

=== Other wins (5) ===
- 1997 Wizz Cup (Colombia), Cali Open (Colombia), Farallones Open (Colombia)
- 1999 Serrezuela Open (Colombia)
- 2001 Viña del Mar Open (Chile)

== Playoff record ==
European Senior Tour playoff record (0–1)

No.	Year	Tournament	Opponent	Result
1	2018	Senior Italian Open	(United States) Clark Dennis	Lost to par on first extra hole

== Results in senior major championships ==
Tournament	2019	2020	2021	2022
The Tradition		NT		
Senior PGA Championship	T35	NT	CUT	CUT
U.S. Senior Open		NT		CUT
Senior Players Championship				
Senior British Open Championship	CUT	NT	CUT	T67

Did not play

"T" indicates a tie for a place
CUT = missed the halfway cut
NT = No tournament due to COVID-19 pandemic

== See also ==
- 2005 Challenge Tour graduates
