= Ricardo González (golfer) =

Argentine golfer

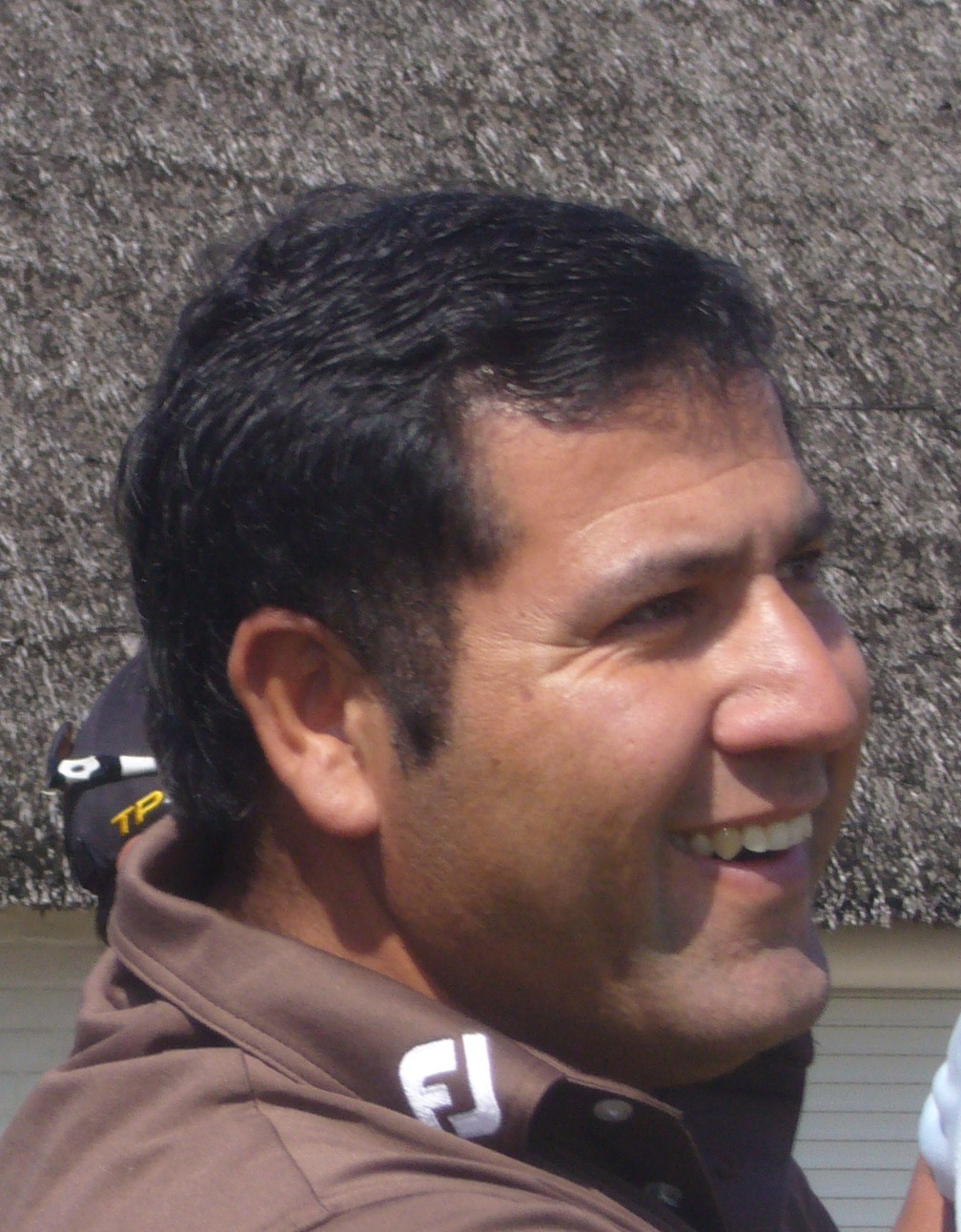
- González at the 2009 KLM Open

Personal information
- Nationality: Argentina
- Born: 24 October 1969 (age 57) Corrientes, Argentina
- Height: 1.83 m (6 ft 0 in)
- Weight: 93 kg (205 lb; 14.6 st)

Career
- Sport: Golf
- Turned professional: 1986
- Current tours: PGA Tour Champions; European Senior Tour; TPG Tour
- Former tours: European Tour; Challenge Tour
- Professional wins: 29
- Highest ranking: 61 (20 October 2002)

Number of wins by tour
- European Tour: 4
- Challenge Tour: 2
- PGA Tour Champions: 1
- European Senior Tour: 1
- Other: 21

Best results in major championships
- Masters Tournament: DNP
- PGA Championship: T10: 2002
- U.S. Open: DNP
- The Open Championship: CUT: 1990, 2002

Achievements and awards
- TPG Tour Order of Merit winner: 2018
- PGA Tour Champions Rookie of the Year: 2024

Ricardo González (born 24 October 1969) is an Argentine professional golfer.

== Career ==
In 1986, González turned professional. He has spent much of his career in Europe. González won a place on the European Tour in 1992 through qualifying school after playing on the second-tier Challenge Tour in 1991. Having failed to win sufficient money to retain his tour card, he returned to the Challenge Tour in 1993.

Having moved to Africa, González returned to Europe in 1998 after winning the Challenge Tour-sanctioned Tusker Kenya Open, and secured a second shot on the European Tour by finishing 5th on the Challenge Tour Rankings that season. He has successfully retained his playing privileges since then by consistently finishing inside the top 115 of the Order of Merit each year.

González has accumulated four European Tour wins, with a best year-end ranking on the European Tour Order of Merit of 25th place in 2001. He has also won many tournaments in South America, and has represented Argentina at the World Cup on four occasions, in 1996, 1998, 2005 and 2007.

He won his fourth career European Tour event in 2009 at the SAS Masters in Sweden by two strokes over Welshman Jamie Donaldson. It was his first win on the European Tour in five years.

After several down years, González qualified for the European Tour through qualifying school in 2016. At age 47, he was the oldest Q school graduate in Tour history.

In February 2024, González won the Trophy Hassan II on PGA Tour Champions. He played the remainder of the season on PGA Tour Champions, finishing 10th on the season-long Charles Schwab Cup standings and being awarded with Rookie of the Year honours.

== Awards and honors ==
- In 2018, González won the Order of Merit on the TPG Tour.
- In 2024, González won Rookie of the Year on the PGA Tour Champions.

== Professional wins (29) ==
=== European Tour wins (4) ===
| No. | Date | Tournament | Winning score | Margin of victory | Runner(s)-up |
|---|---|---|---|---|---|
| 1 | 9 Sep 2001 | Omega European Masters | −16 (65-67-68-68=268) | 3 strokes | (Denmark) Søren Hansen |
| 2 | 26 Oct 2003 | Telefónica Open de Madrid | −14 (69-70-66-65=270) | 1 stroke | (England) Paul Casey, (Republic of Ireland) Pádraig Harrington, (Australia) Nick O'Hern, (Sweden) Mårten Olander |
| 3 | 18 Apr 2004 | Open de Sevilla | −14 (70-66-69-69=274) | 2 strokes | (Scotland) Stephen Gallacher, (England) Jonathan Lomas |
| 4 | 26 Jul 2009 | SAS Masters | −10 (68-68-77-69=282) | 2 strokes | (Wales) Jamie Donaldson |

European Tour playoff record (0–1)

| No. | Year | Tournament | Opponents | Result |
|---|---|---|---|---|
| 1 | 2013 | Johnnie Walker Championship at Gleneagles | (England) Tommy Fleetwood, (Scotland) Stephen Gallacher | Fleetwood won with birdie on first extra hole |

=== Challenge Tour wins (2) ===
| No. | Date | Tournament | Winning score | Margin of victory | Runner-up |
|---|---|---|---|---|---|
| 1 | 23 Sep 1990 | Esab Open | −9 (67-68=135) (Note: Shortened to 36 holes due to weather.) | Playoff | (Denmark) Ole Eskildsen |
| 2 | 15 Mar 1998 | Tusker Kenya Open | −12 (69-65-69-69=272) | Playoff | (Kenya) Jacob Okello |

Challenge Tour playoff record (2–0)

| No. | Year | Tournament | Opponent | Result |
|---|---|---|---|---|
| 1 | 1990 | Esab Open | (Denmark) Ole Eskildsen | Won with par on second extra hole |
| 2 | 1998 | Tusker Kenya Open | (Kenya) Jacob Okello | Won with par on third extra hole |

=== TPG Tour wins (9) ===
| No. | Date | Tournament | Winning score | Margin of victory | Runner(s)-up |
|---|---|---|---|---|---|
| 1 | 9 Jun 2007 | Abierto del Norte | −19 (65-67-66-67=265) | Shared title with (Argentina) Andrés Romero | |
| 2 | 29 Nov 2009 | Abierto del Litoral | −3 (70-69-71-67=277) | Playoff | (Argentina) Andrés Romero |
| 3 | 3 Oct 2010 | Abierto del Litoral (2) | −7 (71-70-68-64=273) | 3 strokes | (Argentina) Rafael Gómez, (Argentina) Mauricio Molina |
| 4 | 30 Sep 2012 | Argentine PGA Championship | −9 (73-72-66-68=279) | 4 strokes | (Argentina) Francisco Bidé, (Argentina) Clodomiro Carranza, (Argentina) Roberto Cóceres, (Argentina) Emilio Domínguez |
| 5 | 24 Nov 2013 | Abierto del Litoral (3) | −12 (66-69-64-69=268) | 4 strokes | (Argentina) Sergio Acevedo |
| 6 | 28 Jan 2018 | Abierto del Sur | −20 (68-67-60-65=260) | 1 stroke | (Argentina) Maximiliano Godoy |
| 7 | 30 Sep 2018 | Abierto de Salta | −15 (69-64-69-67=269) | 1 stroke | (Argentina) Maximiliano Godoy |
| 8 | 15 Mar 2020 | Abierto Norpatagónico | −6 (69-67=136) (Note: Shortened to 36 holes due to COVID-19 concerns.) | Shared title with (Argentina) Andrés Gallegos | |
| 9 | 22 Jan 2023 | Abierto del Sur (2) | −11 (64-71-65-69=269) | 7 strokes | (Argentina) Exequiel López, (Argentina) Jaime López Rivarola |

=== Other wins (12) ===
- 1987 Rosario City Open (Arg)
- 1988 Praderas Grand Prix (Arg)
- 1995 Uruguay Open, La Plata Open (Arg)
- 1996 Chile Open
- 1997 Foz Iguazu Open (Brazil), Prince of Wales Open (Chile), Nigerian Open
- 1998 JPGA Championship (Arg)
- 2003 Abierto del Litoral (Arg)
- 2005 Abierto del Litoral (Arg)
- 2006 Parana Open (Arg)

=== PGA Tour Champions wins (1) ===
| No. | Date | Tournament | Winning score | Margin of victory | Runner-up |
|---|---|---|---|---|---|
| 1 | 24 Feb 2024 | Trophy Hassan II | −10 (69-70-70=209) | 1 stroke | (Denmark) Thomas Bjørn |

=== European Senior Tour wins (1) ===
| No. | Date | Tournament | Winning score | Margin of victory | Runner-up |
|---|---|---|---|---|---|
| 1 | 23 Oct 2022 | Italian Senior Open | −2 (69-72-70=211) | 3 strokes | (South Africa) James Kingston |

== Results in major championships ==
| Tournament | 1990 | 1991 | 1992 | 1993 | 1994 | 1995 | 1996 | 1997 | 1998 | 1999 |
|---|---|---|---|---|---|---|---|---|---|---|
| The Open Championship | CUT | | | | | | | | | |
| PGA Championship | | | | | | | | | | |

| Tournament | 2000 | 2001 | 2002 | 2003 | 2004 |
|---|---|---|---|---|---|
| The Open Championship | | | CUT | | |
| PGA Championship | | | T10 | CUT | CUT |

Note: González never played in the Masters Tournament or the U.S. Open.

Top 10
Did not play

CUT = missed the half-way cut
"T" = tied

== Results in World Golf Championships ==
| Tournament | 2002 | 2003 | 2004 | 2005 | 2006 | 2007 | 2008 | 2009 |
|---|---|---|---|---|---|---|---|---|
| Match Play | | | | | | | | |
| Championship | | | | | | | | |
| Invitational | T28 | | T50 | | | | | |
| Champions | | | | | | | | T45 |

Did not play

"T" = Tied
Note that the HSBC Champions did not become a WGC event until 2009.

== Team appearances ==
- World Cup (representing Argentina): 1996, 1998, 2005, 2007

== See also ==
- 2014 European Tour Qualifying School graduates
- 2016 European Tour Qualifying School graduates
