= Carilo Open =

Golf tournament

The Carilo Open, or the Abierto de Cariló, was a golf tournament on the TPG Tour, the official professional golf tour in Argentina. First held in 1983, it has always been held at the Carilo Golf Club, in Cariló, Buenos Aires Province.

The tournament not held in 1985, 1986, 1988, 1989, and from 1991 to 2000.

== Winners ==
Year	Winner	Runner-up
2011	Rafael Gómez	Tomas Cocha
2009–10	No tournament	
2008	Rafael Gómez	Mauricio Molina
2007	Martin Velazquez	Juan Carlos Coceres
2006	Daniel Vancsik	Emilio Dominguez
2005	Jorge Berendt	Ricardo Aranda
2004	Alfonso Barrera	Raul Perez
2003	Eduardo Argiro	Rodolfo González
2002	Miguel Fernández	Ariel Cañete
2001	Jorge Berendt*	Roberto Coceres
1991–2000	No tournament	
1990	Miguel Guzmán	
1988–89	No tournament	
1987	Miguel Ángel Martín*	Jorge Soto
1985–86	No tournament	
1984	Eduardo Romero	
1983	Antonio Ortiz	
