= Julio Zapata =

Argentine golfer

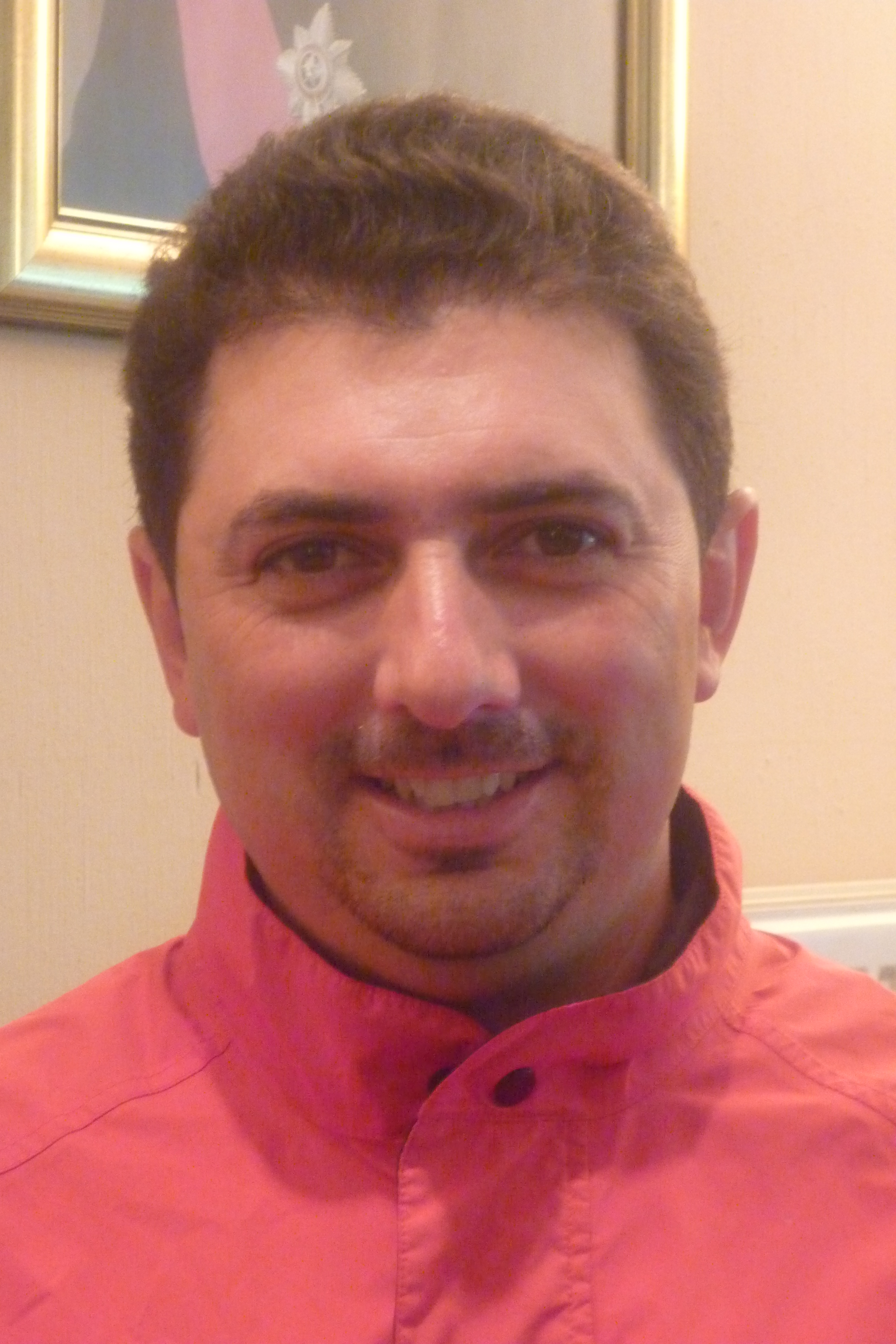

Personal information
- Full name: Julio César Zapata
- Nationality: Argentina
- Born: 22 July 1976 (age 50) Rafaela, Santa Fe, Argentina
- Height: 1.76 m (5 ft 9 in)
- Weight: 76 kg (168 lb; 12.0 st)
- Spouse: Paola (m. 2007)
- Children: 2

Career
- Sport: Golf
- Turned professional: 1997
- Former tours: European Tour; Challenge Tour; PGA Tour Latinoamérica; Tour de las Américas; TPG Tour; Chilean Tour
- Professional wins: 18

Julio César Zapata (born 22 July 1976) is an Argentine professional golfer.

== Career ==
In 1976, Zapata was born in Rafaela, Santa Fe Province.

In 1997, he turned professional. In 2005, Zapata was second in the Argentina Tour rankings, winning the Norpatagonico Open and finishing second in five other tournaments, including the Argentine Masters and the Coast Open. The following year, he won the Players Championship on the Tour de las Américas, and was third on that tour's Order of Merit. In 2008 he won the South Open, the last tournament of the 2008 TPG Tour.

Following a successful season on the Challenge Tour in 2007 with eight top ten finishes, highlighted by a second-place finish in Challenge of Ireland, he graduated to the European Tour in 2008. He finished 138th on the Order of Merit, with a best result of 11th in the Omega European Masters, and as a result failed to maintain his playing privileges and dropped back down to the Challenge Tour for 2009, where he did enough to regain his European Tour card for 2011 by ending the season in 11th place on the rankings.

== Professional wins (18) ==
=== Tour de las Américas wins (1) ===
No.	Date	Tournament	Winning score	Margin of victory	Runners-up
1	28 May 2006	TLA Players Championship	−19 (60-70-67=197)	2 strokes	(Argentina) Miguel Fernández, (Argentina) Fabián Gómez

=== TPG Tour wins (8) ===
No.	Date	Tournament	Winning score	Margin of victory	Runner(s)-up
1	10 Mar 2007	Abierto de la Mesopotamia	−16 (65-74-64=203)	6 strokes	(Argentina) Rubén Alvarez, (Argentina) Juan Ignacio Gil
2	20 Sep 2008	Abierto de Salta	−5 (70-74-64=208)	1 stroke	(Argentina) César Costilla, (Argentina) Andrés Romero
3	14 Dec 2008	Abierto del Sur	−9 (70-70-65-66=271)	1 stroke	(Argentina) Miguel Guzmán
4	25 Nov 2012	Abierto de San Luis	−13 (70-66-65-70=271)	2 strokes	(Argentina) César Costilla, (Argentina) Paulo Pinto
5	20 Jul 2013	Abierto Termas de Río Hondo	−18 (67-70-68-65=270)	1 stroke	(Argentina) Félix Córdoba, (Argentina) Miguel Rodríguez
6	21 Dec 2013	Abierto de San Luis (2)	−12 (69-65-67=201)	1 stroke	(Argentina) Rafael Echenique, (Argentina) Mauricio Molina
7	30 Sep 2017	Gran Premio Los Pingüinos	−11 (67-66=133)	2 strokes	(Argentina) Joaquín Bonjour
8	30 Nov 2018	Buenos Aires Classic	−10 (67-67=134)	1 stroke	(Argentina) Oreste Focaccia, (Argentina) Rodolfo González

=== Chilean Tour wins (2) ===
No.	Date	Tournament	Winning score	Margin of victory	Runner-up
1	1 Mar 2015	Abierto La Posada	−2 (70-76-67-73=286)	Playoff	(Chile) Nicolás Geyger
2	31 Jan 2016	Abierto de Granadilla	−9 (69-70-69-71=279)	1 stroke	(Argentina) Clodomiro Carranza

=== Other Argentine wins (6) ===
- 2000 Parana Open
- 2002 La Cumbre Grand Prix
- 2003 Villa Mercedes Open
- 2004 San Nicolas Grand Prix
- 2005 Norpatagonico Open
- 2006 Tandil Open

=== Other wins (1) ===
- 2010 Santo Domingo Open (Chile)

== See also ==
- 2007 Challenge Tour graduates
- 2010 Challenge Tour graduates
