= Miguel Guzmán (golfer) =

Argentine golfer

Personal information
- Full name: Miguel Guzmán
- Nationality: Argentina
- Born: 22 January 1961 (age 65) Santiago del Estero

Career
- Sport: Golf
- Turned professional: 1981
- Former tours: European Tour; Tour de las Américas; TPG Tour
- Professional wins: 25

Miguel Guzmán (born 22 January 1961) is an Argentine professional golfer.

== Career ==
Born in Santiago del Estero, Guzmán worked as a caddie in Santiago del Estero, before turning professional in 1981.

During his career, Guzmán won the Argentine Professional Ranking in 1990. He won more than twenty tournaments in South America.

Guzmán played on European Tour in 1993 and his best finish was 16th in the Kronenbourg Open. He represented Argentina in the World Cup on two occasions and was 6th in 1990 with your partner Luis Carbonetti.

== Professional wins (25) ==
=== Tour de las Américas wins (1) ===
No.	Date	Tournament	Winning score	Margin of victory	Runners-up
1	28 Oct 2005	MasterCard Brazil Open	−13 (68-67-71-69=275)	7 strokes	(Argentina) Eduardo Argiró, (Argentina) Mauricio Molina

=== TPG Tour wins (2) ===
No.	Date	Tournament	Winning score	Margin of victory	Runner-up
1	11 Nov 2007	Roberto De Vicenzo Classic	−4 (284)	Playoff	(Argentina) Sergio Acevedo
2	13 Oct 2013	San Eliseo Copa Gangoni	−7 (71-74-70-66=281)	Playoff	(Paraguay) Carlos Franco

=== Other Argentine wins (17) ===
- 1989 South Open, North Open
- 1990 Carilo Open, South Open, Cardales Grand Prix, San Diego Grand Prix, Abierto del Litoral
- 1993 North Open
- 1994 La Plata Open, Norpatagonico Open
- 1996 La Plata Open
- 1997 North Open
- 1998 South Open
- 1999 Buenos Aires Open, Neuquen Open
- 2001 Acantilados Grand Prix
- 2002 Ranelagh Open

=== Colombian wins (3) ===
- 1994 Bogota Open
- 1998 Colombian Open
- 2000 Serrezuela Open

=== Other wins (2) ===
- 1979 Argentine National Caddies Tournament
- 1994 Campestre Selaya Club Grand Prix (Mex)

== Team appearances ==
- Dunhill Cup (representing Argentina): 1990
- World Cup (representing Argentina): 1990, 1994
