= Salta Open =

The Salta Open, or the Abierto de Salta, was a golf tournament on the TPG Tour, the official professional golf tour in Argentina. Played from 2004 to 2008, it was always held at the Salta Golf & Polo Club, in Salta, Salta Province.

== Winners ==
Year	Winner	Score	Runner-up
2008	(Argentina) Julio Zapata	208 (-5)	Andrés Romero
2007	(Argentina) Andrés Romero	270 (-14)	Miguel Guzmán
2006	(Argentina) Agustin Jauretche	272 (-12)	Carlos Cardeza
2005	(Argentina) Miguel Rodríguez	273 (-11)	Juan Pablo Abbate
2004	(Argentina) Rafael Echenique	279 (-5)	Eduardo Romero, Mauricio Molina
