= San Luis Open =

San Luis Open may refer to:

- San Luis Open (golf)
- San Luis Open (tennis)
