= Carlos Franco =

Paraguayan professional golfer (born 1965)

Personal information
- Full name: Carlos Daniel Franco
- Nationality: Paraguay
- Born: 24 May 1965 (age 61) Asunción, Paraguay
- Height: 5 ft 9 in (1.75 m)

Career
- Sport: Golf
- Turned professional: 1986
- Current tour: PGA Tour Champions
- Former tours: PGA Tour; Japan Golf Tour; Asia Golf Circuit; Tour de las Américas
- Professional wins: 25
- Highest ranking: 16 (9 January 2000)

Number of wins by tour
- PGA Tour: 4
- Japan Golf Tour: 5
- PGA Tour Champions: 2
- Other: 14

Best results in major championships
- Masters Tournament: T6: 1999
- PGA Championship: T18: 2003
- U.S. Open: T34: 1999
- The Open Championship: T54: 2001

Achievements and awards
- Asia Golf Circuit Order of Merit winner: 1994
- PGA Tour Rookie of the Year: 1999
Medal record
Pan American Games
Silver medal – second place	2019 Lima	Mixed team
South American Games
Silver medal – second place	2022 Asunción	Mixed team

Carlos Daniel Franco (born 24 May 1965) is a Paraguayan professional golfer who currently plays on the PGA Tour Champions.

== Early life ==
In 1965, Franco was born in Asunción, the Paraguayan capital. He comes from a poor background and grew up in a one-room, dirt-floor home. His father was a greenkeeper and caddie, and he has five brothers, all of whom became golf professionals. One of his brothers is Ángel Franco.

== Professional career ==
In 1986, Franco turned professional. He has played in many parts of the world. He has won more than twenty tournaments in Latin America, and from 1994 to 1999 he won five times on the Japan Golf Tour. He also won the 1994 Philippine Open title on the Asia Golf Circuit and claimed the Order of Merit title that season.

Franco first played on the U.S.-based PGA Tour in 1999 and was fully exempt until 2006. He was the first rookie to surpass $1 million in earnings in a season and won the PGA Tour Rookie of the Year title. He won four times on the PGA Tour. He has featured in the top 20 of the Official World Golf Rankings, going as high as 16th in 2000. He is also one of the few non-Americans to win a Presidents Cup as a member of the 1998 team. After struggling to stay on the PGA Tour, Franco also played on the Web.com Tour and PGA Tour Latinoamérica.

Franco joined the Champions Tour after turning 50. He has won twice at the Shaw Charity Classic and the Bass Pro Shops Legends of Golf, a pairs tournament with Vijay Singh. At the 2019 Pan American Games, Franco teamed with Fabrizio Zanotti, Julieta Granada, and Sofia García, to win the silver medal in the mixed team event.

== Professional wins (25) ==
=== PGA Tour wins (4) ===
No.	Date	Tournament	Winning score	Margin of victory	Runner(s)-up
1	9 May 1999	Compaq Classic of New Orleans	−19 (66-69-68-66=269)	2 strokes	(United States) Steve Flesch, (United States) Harrison Frazar
2	11 Jul 1999	Greater Milwaukee Open	−16 (65-66-67-66=264)	2 strokes	(United States) Tom Lehman
3	7 May 2000	Compaq Classic of New Orleans (2)	−18 (67-67-68-68=270)	Playoff	(United States) Blaine McCallister
4	25 Jul 2004	U.S. Bank Championship in Milwaukee (2)	−13 (68-63-69-67=267)	2 strokes	(United States) Fred Funk, (United States) Brett Quigley

PGA Tour playoff record (1–0)

No.	Year	Tournament	Opponent	Result
1	2000	Compaq Classic of New Orleans	(United States) Blaine McCallister	Won with par on second extra hole

=== PGA of Japan Tour wins (5) ===
No.	Date	Tournament	Winning score	Margin of victory	Runner(s)-up
1	25 Sep 1994	Gene Sarazen Jun Classic	−16 (65-67-68-72=272)	2 strokes	(Japan) Tsuneyuki Nakajima
2	11 Jun 1995	Sapporo Tokyu Open	−10 (68-69-69-72=278)	1 stroke	(Japan) Shinji Ikeuchi, (Japan) Kazuhiro Takami
3	15 Sep 1996	ANA Open	−6 (67-73-74-68=282)	1 stroke	(Japan) Masahiro Kuramoto
4	29 Mar 1998	Just System KSB Open	−17 (70-65-67-65=267)	4 strokes	(Philippines) Frankie Miñoza
5	10 May 1998	Fujisankei Classic	−9 (69-70-67-69=275)	1 stroke	(Taiwan) Chen Tze-chung

PGA of Japan Tour playoff record (0–1)

No.	Year	Tournament	Opponents	Result
1	1996	Dydo Drinco Shizuoka Open	(Japan) Yoshikazu Sakamoto, (Japan) Nobuo Serizawa	Sakamoto won with par on first extra hole

=== Asia Golf Circuit wins (1) ===
No.	Date	Tournament	Winning score	Margin of victory	Runner-up
1	20 Feb 1994	Manila Southwoods Philippine Open	−8 (72-69-68-71=280)	Playoff	(South Korea) Choi Sang-ho

Asia Golf Circuit playoff record (1–0)

No.	Year	Tournament	Opponent	Result
1	1994	Manila Southwoods Philippine Open	(South Korea) Choi Sang-ho	Won with par on first extra hole

=== Tour de las Américas wins (5) ===
No.	Date	Tournament	Winning score	Margin of victory	Runner-up
1	1992	Paraguay Open			
2	1993	Uruguay Open			
3	10 Dec 2000	Paraguay Open (2)			
4	2 Dec 2001	Chevrolet Brazil Open	−11 (69-67-67-70=273)	4 strokes	(Argentina) Miguel Guzmán
5	30 Nov 2003	American Express Trump Brazil Open (2)	−3 (70-71-69-71=281)	Playoff	(Argentina) Eduardo Argiró

=== Other wins (8) ===
- 1985 Chile Open
- 1986 Chaco Open (Argentina)
- 1987 Asunción Open (Paraguay)
- 1990 Norpatagonico Open (Argentina)
- 1991 Daytron Cup (Paraguay)
- 1993 Los Leones Open (Chile), Asunción Open (Paraguay)
- 2004 Center Open (Argentina)

=== PGA Tour Champions wins (2) ===
No.	Date	Tournament	Winning score	Margin of victory	Runners-up
1	4 Sep 2016	Shaw Charity Classic	−18 (66-63-63=192)	2 strokes	(United States) Michael Allen, (Germany) Bernhard Langer
2	23 Apr 2017	Bass Pro Shops Legends of Golf (with (Fiji) Vijay Singh)	−15 (51-42=93)	1 stroke	(United States) Fred Funk and (United States) Jeff Sluman, (United States) Paul Goydos and (United States) Kevin Sutherland, (United States) Corey Pavin and (United States) Duffy Waldorf

== Results in major championships ==
Tournament	1994	1995	1996	1997	1998	1999	2000	2001	2002	2003	2004	2005
Masters Tournament						T6	T7	46				CUT
U.S. Open						T34	T61	CUT			WD	CUT
The Open Championship	CUT				T64	CUT	CUT	T54				
PGA Championship				70	T40	T26	T58	T29		T18	T31	T59

Top 10
Did not play

WD = Withdrew
CUT = missed the halfway cut
"T" indicates a tie for a place.

=== Summary ===
Tournament	Wins	2nd	3rd	Top-5	Top-10	Top-25	Events	Cuts made
Masters Tournament	0	0	0	0	2	2	4	3
U.S. Open	0	0	0	0	0	0	5	2
The Open Championship	0	0	0	0	0	0	5	2
PGA Championship	0	0	0	0	0	1	8	8
Totals	0	0	0	0	2	3	22	15

- Most consecutive cuts made – 4 (1998 Open Championship – 1999 U.S. Open)
- Longest streak of top-10s – 1 (twice)

== Results in The Players Championship ==
Tournament	1999	2000	2001	2002	2003	2004	2005	2006
The Players Championship	CUT	T27	CUT	T22	T48	T58	CUT	T45

CUT = missed the halfway cut
"T" indicates a tie for a place.

== Results in World Golf Championships ==
Tournament	1999	2000	2001	2002	2003	2004
Match Play	R32	R64				
Championship	T48	T45	NT^{1}			T28
Invitational	T7	T27	20	T42		T58

^{1}Cancelled due to 9/11

Top 10
Did not play

QF, R16, R32, R64 = Round in which player lost in match play
"T" = Tied
NT = No tournament

== Results in senior major championships ==
Results are not in chronological order before 2022.

Tournament	2015	2016	2017	2018	2019	2020	2021	2022	2023
The Tradition		T48	T34	T34	68	NT	T74		
Senior PGA Championship		CUT	T38	T49	T28	NT	CUT		
U.S. Senior Open			CUT	T28		NT	CUT		
Senior Players Championship		T20	T54	T43	67	T56	T72	T61	T70
Senior British Open Championship	CUT	T18	T43			NT		T29	CUT

Did not play

CUT = missed the halfway cut
"T" indicates a tie for a place
NT = No tournament due to COVID-19 pandemic

== Team appearances ==
- Alfred Dunhill Cup (representing Paraguay): 1991, 1993, 1994, 1999
- World Cup (representing Paraguay): 1992, 2000, 2001, 2003, 2005, 2007
- Presidents Cup (International Team): 1998 (winners), 2000

== See also ==
- 1998 PGA Tour Qualifying School graduates
- 2007 PGA Tour Qualifying School graduates
