= North Open =

Tournament information
- Location: Tucumán, Argentina
- Established: 1962
- Course(s): Jockey Club
- Par: 71
- Tour(s): TPG Tour (Argentina)
- Format: Stroke play
- Final year: 2024

Tournament record score
- Aggregate: 258 Andrés Romero (2006)

Current champion
- Augusto Núñez

The North Open, or Abierto del Norte, was one of the major regional golf tournaments in Argentina. First held in 1962, it was always held at the Jockey Club, in Tucumán, the hometown of golfers César Monasterio and Andrés Romero.

Eduardo Romero has won the most titles, with five victories, closely followed by Roberto De Vicenzo and Andrés Romero with four each. The record aggregate score is 258, achieved by Andrés Romero in 2006. In 1991 and 2007 the championship ended in a tie, with no playoff being held to determine an outright winner.

== Winners ==
Year	Winner	Score	Runner(s)-up	Amateur winner
2025	Augusto Núñez	265	Franco Romero	Mariano Malmierca
2024	Félix Córdoba	274	Jorge Monroy	
2023	Nelson Ledesma	264	Mauro Baez	
2022	Jorge Monroy	275	César Costilla	
2021	Augusto Núñez	263	César Costilla	
2020				
2019	César Costilla	265	Julio Zapata	
2018	Jorge Monroy	199	Ricardo González	
2017	César Costilla	263	Leandro Marelli	
2016	Jorge Monroy	273	Sergio Acevedo	
2012–15	No tournament			
2011	Miguel Rodríguez	264	César Costilla	Jorge Fernandez Valdez
2010	Jorge Monroy	264	Nelson Ledesma, Roberto Coceres, César Costilla, Franco Barrera	Jorge Fernandez Valdez
2009	Leandro Marelli (am)	263	Andrés Romero	Leandro Marelli
2008	Andrés Romero	264	Ángel Cabrera, Emiliano Grillo (amateur)	Emiliano Grillo
2007	Andrés Romero; Ricardo González	265	First place tie, no playoff	Augusto Bruchmann Jr
2006	Andrés Romero	258	César Costilla	Sebastian Saavedra
2005	Ángel Cabrera	259	César Costilla	Estanislao Goya
2004	Ángel Cabrera	265	Eduardo Romero	Emilio Dominguez
2003	Andrés Romero	273	Luis Rueda	Alejandro Martinez
2002	Eduardo Argiro	272	Daniel Vancsik	Jaime Nougues
2001	Amateur championship only			Jaime Nougues
2000	Luis Carbonetti	269	Raúl Fretes	Matias Anselmo
1999	No tournament due to the Jockey Club's 60th anniversary			
1998	Eduardo Romero	269	Pedro Martínez	Jaime Nougues
1997	Miguel Guzmán	268	Mauricio Molina	Jaime Nougues
1996	Jorge Berendt	266	Pablo Benzadon	Fernando Delia
1995	Gustavo Rojas	269	Ricardo González	Juan Pablo Abbate
1994	Eduardo Romero	270	Armando Saavedra	Pablo Alderete
1993	Miguel Guzmán	273	Augusto Bruchmann (amateur)	Augusto Bruchmann
1992	Eduardo Romero	270		Fernando Chiesa
1991	Adan Sowa; Eduardo Romero	265	First place tie, no playoff	Francisco Aleman
1990	Miguel Fernández	276		Ronnie Damm
1989	Miguel Guzmán	271	Luis Carbonetti	Augusto Bruchmann
1988	Pedro Martínez	265	Adan Sowa	Augusto Bruchmann
1987	Eduardo Romero	272	Luis Carbonetti, Antonio Ortiz	Manuel Tagle
1986	Amateur championship only			Jorge Nicolosi
1985	Luis Carbonetti	271	Hugo Vizzone	Jaime Nougues
1984	No professionals			Luis Carbonetti
1983	Roberto De Vicenzo	280	Jorge Soto	Andres Schonbaum
1982	No tournament due to the Falklands War			
1981	Amateur championship only			Jaime Nougues
1980	Horacio Carbonetti	280	Jorge Soto	Jorge Nicolosi
1979	Amateur championship only			Augusto Bruchmann
1978	Amateur championship only			Luis Carbonetti
1977	Amateur championship only			Alejandro Gonzalez Bosch
1976	Amateur championship only			Roberto Monguzzi
1975	Jorge Soto	276	Fidel de Luca	Jorge Nicolosi
1974	Roberto De Vicenzo	274		Juan Manuel Cossio
1973	Roberto De Vicenzo	275		Juan Manuel Cossio
1972	Luis Daneri (amateur)	272	Vicente Fernández, Mario Romero	Luis Daneri
1971	Fidel de Luca	270	Carlos Liberto	Roberto Monguzzi
1970	Juan Carlos Molina	278		Roberto Monguzzi
1969	Juan Monroy	273		Roberto Monguzzi
1968	Juan Carlos Molina	273	Fidel de Luca	Jorge Ledesma
1967	Vicente Fernández	275	Leopoldo Ruiz, Florentino Molina	Jorge De Azcuenaga
1966	No tournament due to the Jockey Club hosting the Argentine Open			
1965	Fidel de Luca	274		Jorge Ledesma
1964	Amateur championship only			Jorge Ledesma
1963	Leopoldo Ruiz	278		Roberto Monguzzi
1962	Roberto De Vicenzo	281	Juan Das Neves	Fernando Nougues
