= TPG Tour =

Professional golf tour

- Current season, competition or edition: 2026 TPG Tour
- Sport: Golf
- Founded: 2007
- First season: 2007
- Country: Based in Argentina (Note: Schedules have also included events in Paraguay and Uruguay.)
- Most titles: Order of Merit titles: (Argentina) César Costilla (4); Tournament wins: (Argentina) Fabián Gómez (14)
- Related competitions: Tour de las Américas; PGA Tour Latinoamérica Developmental Series
- Website: https://tourgolf.ar.plus.golf/

The TPG Tour (Tour de Profesionales de Golf) is the principal professional golf tour in Argentina. The tour was formed in 2007, following disputes within the PGA of Argentina, who had operated the main professional tour in the country in previous years.

The tour operated exclusively in Argentina in its inaugural season, but this changed in 2008 with the inclusion of the Carlos Franco Invitational, held in Paraguay. There were seventeen events in 2007 and sixteen in 2008, including the flagship Argentine Open and Argentine Masters, as well as the major regional opens, the South Open, Center Open, North Open and Coast Open.

The TPG Tour developed a close relationship with the higher level Tour de las Américas, with several events being co-sanctioned, which resulted in increased prize funds and stronger fields. Through the Tour de las Américas, some events were also co-sanctioned by the Challenge Tour and the Canadian Tour.

== Order of Merit winners ==
| Year | Winner | Points |
|---|---|---|
| 2025 | (Argentina) Franco Romero | 1,606 |
| 2024 | (Argentina) Ignacio Marino | 1,329 |
| 2023 | (Argentina) Nelson Ledesma (2) | 1,369 |
| 2022 | (Argentina) Jorge Monroy (2) | 2,416,478 |
| 2021 | (Argentina) Martín Contini | 1,055,920 |
| 2020 | (Argentina) Andrés Gallegos | 276,000 |
| 2019 | (Argentina) César Costilla (4) | 472,900 |
| 2018 | (Argentina) Ricardo González | 414,660 |
| 2017 | (Argentina) César Costilla (3) | 355,581 |
| 2016 | (Argentina) Jorge Monroy | 241,176 |
| 2015 | (Argentina) Clodomiro Carranza (2) | 150,107 |
| 2014 | (Argentina) Nelson Ledesma | 184,058 |
| 2013 | (Argentina) César Costilla (2) | 125,424 |
| 2012 | (Argentina) Clodomiro Carranza | 136,427 |
| 2011 | (Argentina) Maximiliano Godoy | 111,343 |
| 2010 | (Argentina) Andrés Romero | 146,340 |
| 2009 | (Argentina) César Costilla | 101,588 |
| 2008 | (Argentina) Estanislao Goya | 159,874 |
| 2007 | (Argentina) Rafael Gómez | 133,780 |
