= Norpatagonico Open =

Tournament information
- Location: Bahía Blanca, Argentina
- Established: 1969
- Course: Palihue Golf Club
- Par: 70
- Tour: PGA Tour Latinoamérica Developmental Series
- Format: Stroke play
- Prize fund: $90.000
- Month played: April

Tournament record score
- Aggregate: 267 Fabián Gómez (2009)

Current champion
- (Argentina) Leandro Marelli

The Norpatagonico Open, or Abierto Norpatagónico, is one of the major professional golf tournaments in Argentina. Founded in 1969, it has always been held at the Palihue Golf Club in Bahía Blanca, Buenos Aires Province, although it was not played between 1974 and 1986.

The tournament currently forms part of the PGA Tour Latinoamérica Developmental Series.

== Winners ==
Year	Winner	Score	Runner-up	Amateur winner
2019	(Argentina) Mateo Fernández de Oliveira (a)	275	Matias Simanski	
2018	(Argentina) Leandro Marelli	269	Ricardo González	
2017	(Argentina) Maximiliano Godoy (Argentina) Martin Contini (a)	242		
2016	(Argentina) Sebastián Saavedra	270	Jorge Monroy	
2015	(Argentina) Emilio Domínguez	271	Rafael Gómez	
2014	(Argentina) Sebastián Saavedra	273	Ramón Franco	
2013	(Argentina) Félix Andrés Cordoba	202	Paulo Javier Pinto	
2012	(Argentina) Ariel Cañete	206	Lucas Juncos	
2011	(Argentina) Emilio Domiguez	271	Miguel Ángel Carballo	
2010	No tournament			
2009	(Argentina) Fabián Gómez	267	Clodomiro Carranza	Emiliano Grillo
2008	(Argentina) Daniel Altamirano	272	Mauricio Molina, César Costilla, César Monasterio, Emiliano Grillo (amateur)	Emiliano Grillo
2007	(Argentina) Luciano Dodda (amateur)	273	Roberto Coceres	Luciano Dodda
2006	(Argentina) Rodolfo González	271	Sebastián Fernández	Alan Wagner
2005	(Argentina) Julio Zapata	276	Claudio Machado	Sebastián Saavedra
2004	(Argentina) Rodolfo González	274	Eduardo Argiro	
2003	(Argentina) Eduardo Argiro	276	Ariel Cañete, Roberto Coceres	Patricio Gutierrez
2002	(Argentina) Ariel Cañete	273	César Monasterio	
2001	(Argentina) José Cantero	274	Rodolfo González	Clodomiro Carranza
2000	(Paraguay) Pedro Martínez	275	Eduardo Argiro, Rodolfo González, Rubén Alvarez	
1999	(Argentina) Rodolfo González	273	Ángel Franco	
1998	(Argentina) Rafael Gómez	271	Ricardo González	
1997	(Argentina) Miguel Fernández	272	Fabian Montovia	Guillermo Cantarelli
1996	(Paraguay) Ángel Franco	277	Armando Saavedra, Miguel Guzmán, Sebastián Fernández, Ricardo González	
1995*	(Argentina) Rubén Alvarez	203	Eduardo Romero	
1994	(Argentina) Miguel Guzmán	268	Luis Carbonetti, Gustavo Rojas	
1993	(Argentina) Fabian Montovia	277	Armando Saavedra, Ángel Franco	Gonzalo Ramaciotti
1992	(Argentina) Ángel Cabrera	275	César Monasterio	
1991	(Argentina) Rubén Alvarez	288		
1990	(Paraguay) Carlos Franco	288		
1989	(Argentina) Jorge Berendt	279		
1988	(Argentina) Eduardo Romero	271	Miguel Fernández	
1987	(Argentina) José Cantero	281	Horacio Carbonetti	
1974–86	No tournament			
1973	(Argentina) Vicente Fernández	277		
1972	(Argentina) Fidel de Luca	279		
1971	(Argentina) Florentino Molina	287		
1970	(Argentina) Vicente Fernández	283		
1969	(Argentina) Roberto De Vicenzo	275	Jorge Soto	

* 1995 championship reduced to 54 holes
