= Jamaica Open =

Tournament information
- Location: Jamaica
- Established: 1953
- Course: Tryall Golf Club
- Par: 72
- Tour: Caribbean Tour (1958–1963)
- Format: Stroke play

Current champion
- (United States) Andrew Arft

Location map
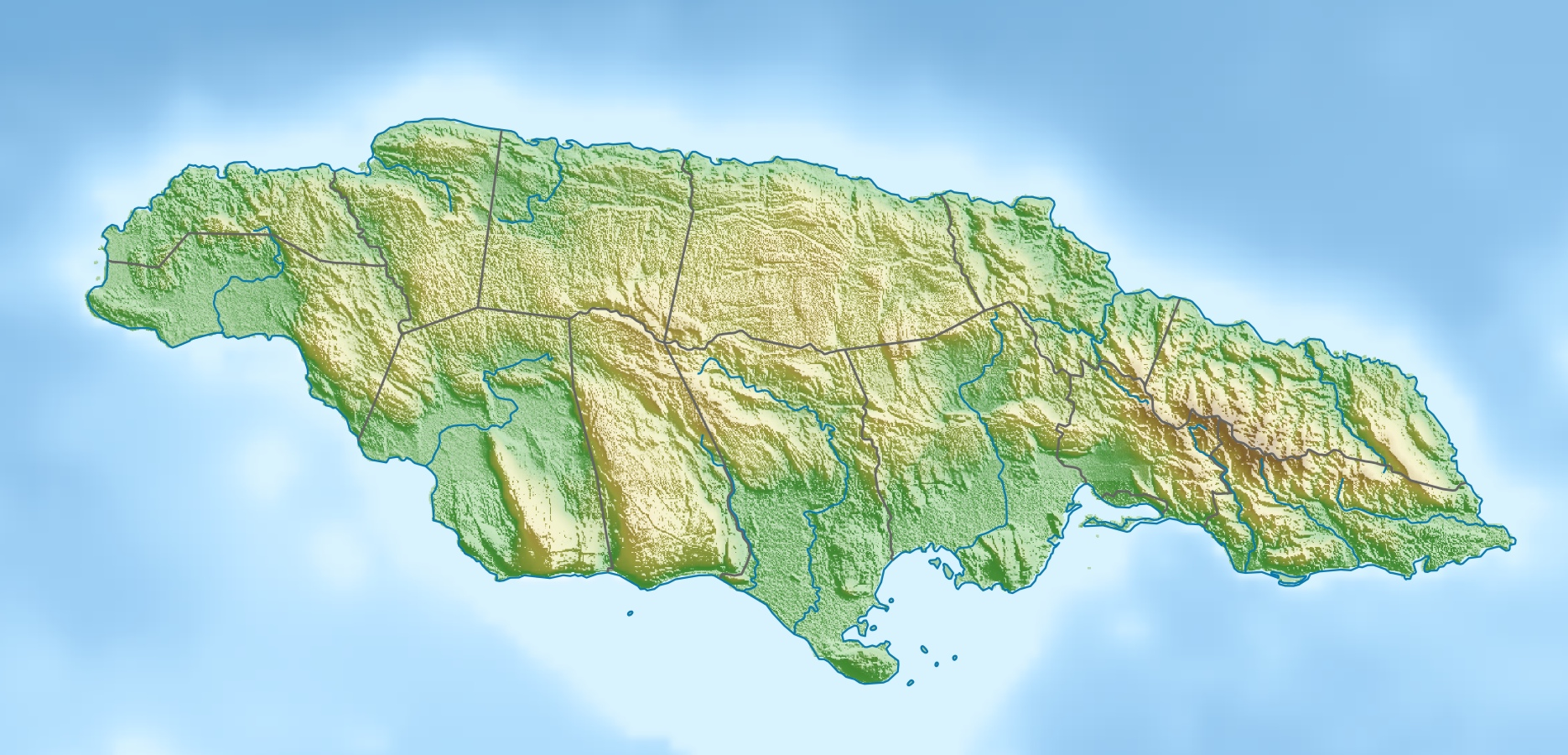
- Location in Jamaica

The Jamaica Open is a golf tournament held in Jamaica. Founded in 1953, it was held annually until 1995 when lack of sponsorship led to a ten-year hiatus. The tournament returned in 2006, and then from 2008 to 2012. After another brief interlude, the 50th Jamaica Open was held in 2017 and it has continued to be staged annually since then.

Between 1958 and 1963, the Jamaica Open was a fixture on the PGA-sponsored Caribbean Tour, at which time it was frequented by many of the leading American professionals. Since it was withdrawn from the Caribbean Tour, it has been a smaller, more local tournament.

== Winners ==
Year	Venue	Winner	Score	Ref
Jamaica Open
2023	Tryall Golf Club	(United States) Andrew Arft	209 (−7)	
2022	Tryall Golf Club	(United States) Patrick Cover	203 (−13)	
2021	Tryall Golf Club	(United States) M. J. Maguire	208 (−8) (Note: Maguire defeated Ryan Sullivan with a birdie on the first hole of a sudden-death play-off.)	
2020	Tryall Golf Club	(United States) Erik Barnes	203 (−13)	
Alacran Jamaica Open
2019	Tryall Golf Club	(United States) Patrick Cover	204 (−12)	
Jamaica Open Golf Championship
2017 (Sep)	Half Moon Resort	(United States) Hernan Borja	204 (−12)	
2017 (Jan)	Half Moon Resort	(England) Paul Eales	215 (−1)	
2013–2016	No tournament			
Half Moon Jamaica Open Golf Championship
2012	Half Moon Resort	(United States) Russ Cochran	203 (–13)	
LIME Jamaica Open Golf Championship
2011	Half Moon Resort	(United States) Russ Cochran	206 (–10)	
2010	Half Moon Resort	(United States) Ron Schroeder	210 (−6)	
2009	Half Moon Resort	(Jamaica) Johnny Bloomfield	214 (−2)	
2008	Half Moon Resort	(Jamaica) Johnny Bloomfield	210 (−6)	
Jamaica Open Golf Championship
2007	No tournament			
2006	Caymanas Golf and Country Club	(Jamaica) Johnny Bloomfield	215 (−1)	
1996–2005	No tournament			
1995	Liguanea Club (Caymanas Course) (Note: After the Caymanas Golf and Country Club closed in 1977, the course was leased by the Liguanea Club until January 1997.)	(United States) Chad Magee	275 (−12)	
1994	Wyndham Rose Hall Resort	(United States) Jeff Leonard	278 (−10)	
1993	Wyndham Rose Hall Resort	(United States) Tom Gillis	280 (−8)	
1992	Wyndham Rose Hall Resort	(United States) Jay Cooper	285 (–3)	
1991	Half Moon Resort	(United States) Jim Thorpe		
1990	Half Moon Resort	(United States) Bruce Fleisher		
1989	Runaway Bay Golf and Country Club	(United States) Charles Raulerson		
1988	Runaway Bay Golf and Country Club	(United States) Jeff Lewis	286 (−2)	
1987	Liguanea Club (Caymanas Course)	(Jamaica) Seymour Rose	279 (−9)	
1986	Liguanea Club (Caymanas Course)	(United States) Bruce Fleisher	277 (−11)	
1985	Liguanea Club (Caymanas Course)	(United States) Al Morton		
1984	Liguanea Club (Caymanas Course)	(United States) Lee Elder	282 (−6)	
1983	Liguanea Club (Caymanas Course)	(England) Barry Lane	285 (−3)	
1982	Liguanea Club (Caymanas Course)	(Jamaica) Seymour Rose	285 (−3) (Note: Rose won with a birdie on the first hole of a sudden-death playoff.)	
1981	Liguanea Club (Caymanas Course)	(United States) David Markham	286 (−2)	
1980	Liguanea Club (Caymanas Course)	(United States) Richard Blake	289 (+1) (Note: Blake won with a par on the third hole of a sudden-death playoff.)	
1979	Liguanea Club (Caymanas Course)	(Jamaica) Norman Marsh	292 (+4) (Note: Marsh won with a par on the first hole of a sudden-death playoff.)	
1978	Liguanea Club (Caymanas Course)	(United States) Richard Bassett	293 (+5)	
1977	Caymanas Golf and Country Club	(Jamaica) Seymour Rose	298 (+10)	
1976	Caymanas Golf and Country Club	(United States) Mike Higuera	283 (−5)	
1975	Half Moon Golf Club	(Australia) Bob Shaw	293 (+5)	
1974	Caymanas Golf and Country Club	(United States) Mike Higuera	282 (−6)	
1973	Ironshore Golf and Country Club	(Scotland) Norman Wood	284 (−4)	
1972	Caymanas Golf and Country Club	(United States) Mike Higuera	289 (+1)	
1971 (Note: First round cancelled because of rain; tournament reduced to 54 holes.)	Constant Spring Club	(Trinidad and Tobago) Sooky Maharaj	209 (−1)	
1970	Caymanas Golf and Country Club	(Jamaica) Alvin Cunningham	294 (+6)	
1969	Constant Spring Club	(Trinidad and Tobago) Lennox Yearwood	285 (+13)	
1968	Caymanas Golf and Country Club	(Jamaica) Billy Ward (a)	303 (+15)	
1967	Constant Spring Club	(Jamaica) Jasper Markland	287 (+15)	
1966	Caymanas Golf and Country Club	(Jamaica) Billy Urquhart	302 (+14)	
1965	Caymanas Golf and Country Club	(Jamaica) Hugh Urquhart	296 (+8)	
1964 (Note: Reduced to 54 holes because of rain.)	Constant Spring Club	(Jamaica) Jasper Markland	212 (+8)	
1963	Caymanas Golf and Country Club	(United States) John Barnum	274 (−14)	
1962	Caymanas Golf and Country Club	(United States) Henry Williams Jr.	274 (−14)	
1961	Caymanas Golf and Country Club	(United States) Jim Ferree	275 (−13)	
1960	Caymanas Golf and Country Club	(United States) Pete Cooper	283 (−5)	
1959	Caymanas Golf and Country Club	(United States) Ed Oliver	277 (−11)	
1958	Caymanas Golf and Country Club	(United States) Bob Toski	283 (−5) (Note: Toski won with a birdie on the second hole of a sudden-death playoff.)	
1957	Constant Spring Club	(Argentina) Roberto De Vicenzo	260 (−12)	
1956	Constant Spring Club	(Argentina) Roberto De Vicenzo	260 (−12)	
1955	Constant Spring Club	(Argentina) Antonio Cerdá	264 (−8)	
1954	Constant Spring Club	(Colombia) Raúl Posse	264 (−8)	
1953	Constant Spring Club	(England) Leslie Ward (a)	281 (+9)	
