= Gordon Cunningham (golfer) =

Scottish golfer (1934–1989)

Personal information
- Full name: William Gordon Cunningham
- Nationality: Scotland
- Born: 1 June 1934 Toronto, Canada
- Died: 8 November 1989 (aged 55) Troon, Scotland

Career
- Sport: Golf
- Status: Professional
- Former tour: European Tour
- Professional wins: 3

Best results in major championships
- Masters Tournament: DNP
- PGA Championship: DNP
- U.S. Open: DNP
- The Open Championship: T31: 1967, 1972

William Gordon Cunningham (1 June 1934 – 8 November 1989) was a Scottish professional golfer. He won the 1969 Scottish Professional Championship. He played 11 times in the Open Championship, making the cut six times including five times in succession between 1965 and 1969.

== Professional career ==
Cunningham was an assistant at Royal Wimbledon from the late-1950s until 1960. He had a top-10 finish in the 1958 Coombe Hill Assistants' Tournament. In 1959 and 1960 he qualified for the Open Championship, but missed the cut on both occasions. Cunningham was then at Sandy Lane in Barbados until the mid-1960s. He made a number of appearances in British events in this period. He qualified for the Open Championship in 1963, 1964 and 1965, making the cut for the first time in 1965. In 1965 he was tied for fourth place in the Gallaher Ulster Open.

Cunningham returned to Scotland in 1966 as the professional at Stranraer, enabling him to play more events on the British circuit. In May 1966 he made a good start to the season with a top-20 finish in the Swallow-Penfold Tournament and was then tied for third place in the Blaxnit (Ulster) Tournament behind Tony Jacklin. In July he again made the cut in the Open Championship and the following week was sixth in the French Open, the leading British player. In late August he was tied for fourth place in the Carroll's International. In 1967 Cunningham finished tied for 31st place in the Open, his best finish. He had some success in the Shell Winter Tournament in late 1967, finishing tied for first place with Eric Brown in one of the semi-finals.

In 1968 Cunningham moved to Troon Municipal where he was the professional until his death in 1989. In May 1968, the week before his move, he finished tied for third place in the Penfold Tournament, just a stroke behind the winner. In June Cunningham played in the Scottish Professional Championship for the first time, finishing third behind Eric Brown, and the following month he won the Cutty Sark Tournament at Pollok. Cunningham was the joint winner, with Brian Barnes, of the Tooting Bec Cup for his second round of 70 in the 1968 Open Championship at Carnoustie, awarded by the PGA for the lowest round by a British or Irish professional. He had had an opening round of 80 but his round of 70 enabled him to make the cut and he finished tied for 35th place. In 1969 Cunningham won the Scottish Professional Championship at Machrihanish and later in the year won the Scottish Uniroyal Tournament at the Bruntsfield Links. He also made the cut in the Open Championship for the fifth successive year.

Cunningham had a top-10 finish in the 1970 John Player Classic, the richest ever tournament in Britain. He won £1,175, the largest prize of his career. In 1971 he was a joint runner-up in the Penfold-Bournemouth Tournament, four strokes behind Neil Coles. In 1972 Cunningham qualified for the Open Championship for the last time, equalling his best-ever finish, tied for 31st place. Later in the year he was selected for the 8-man Scottish team in the Double Diamond International. Cunningham played on the European Tour in its augural season, 1972, with little success. He played less in 1973 and then only occasionally in tour events. He reached the last-16 of the Piccadilly Medal in 1973, before losing to Jimmy Kinsella.

== Personal life ==
Cunningham was married to Margaret Cunningham (née Hadden) and had one son, David McAlpine Cunningham, who is an author and short story writer. He died on 8 November 1989, at the age of 55.

== Professional wins (3) ==
- 1968 Cutty Sark Tournament
- 1969 Scottish Professional Championship, Scottish Uniroyal Tournament

== Results in major championships ==
Tournament	1959	1960	1961	1962	1963	1964	1965	1966	1967	1968	1969	1970	1971	1972
The Open Championship	CUT	CUT			CUT	CUT	T44	T50	T31	T35	T34	CUT		T31

Note: Cunningham only played in The Open Championship.

Did not play

CUT = missed the half-way cut (3rd round cut in 1970 Open Championship)
"T" indicates a tie for a place

== Team appearances ==
- Double Diamond International (representing Scotland): 1972
