= Finlay Morris =

Scottish golfer (1945–1967)

Personal information
- Full name: Finlay Smith Morris
- Nationality: Scotland
- Born: September 1945 Glasgow, Scotland
- Died: 18 November 1967 (aged 22) Elvanfoot, Lanarkshire, Scotland

Career
- Sport: Golf
- Turned professional: 1963
- Professional wins: 1

Best results in major championships
- Masters Tournament: DNP
- PGA Championship: DNP
- U.S. Open: DNP
- The Open Championship: CUT: 1966, 1967

Finlay Smith Morris (September 1945 – 18 November 1967) was a Scottish professional golfer. He was Boys Amateur Champion in 1961 and won the Coca-Cola Tournament at Haggs Castle in 1967. He was killed in a road traffic accident at the age of 22.

== Golf career ==
Morris won the Boys Amateur Championship in 1961 beating Clive Clark 3&2 in the final. He was only 15 years old and was the youngest boys champion since the first Championship in 1921 when the age limit was 16 rather than 18. The previous year Morris had reached the semi-final before losing 2&1 to the eventual winner.

Morris turned professional in late 1963. Initially an assistant at Crews Hill Golf Club in north London, he returned to Scotland after a few months to be assistant at Littlehill Golf Club, north of Glasgow. His father was the manager at the nearby Cawder Golf Club. Morris had little success in his first few years as a professional but had some good performances in 1967. In May he was runner-up in the Scottish Professional Championship, three shots behind Harry Bannerman but five strokes ahead of the rest of the field. In August he won the Scottish Coca-Cola Tournament at Haggs Castle with a 72-hole aggregate of 262 (66-63-67-66), 15 strokes ahead of David Huish, who took second place, taking the first prize of £200.

== Death ==
Morris died in a road traffic accident on 18 November 1967 aged 22. Morris had been competing in the first semi-final of the Shell Winter Tournament at Mere Golf Club, Mere, Cheshire, but had failed to qualify for the final. Morris had reached the semi-final through a qualifying contest at Hilton Park, north of Glasgow, on 4 November. He had been a late replacement, scored 73, and only reached the semi-final by having a better back nine than two others who also scored 73. His father was also seriously injured in the accident.

== Amateur wins ==
- 1961 Boys Amateur Championship
- 1962 Carris Trophy
- 1963 Scottish Boys Championship, West of Scotland Amateur Championship

== Professional wins ==
- 1967 Scottish Coca-Cola Tournament

== Results in major championships ==
Tournament	1966	1967
The Open Championship	CUT	CUT

Note: Morris only played in The Open Championship.
CUT = missed the half-way cut

== Team appearances ==
Amateur

- Boys' match v Continent of Europe (representing combined England & Scotland): 1961 (winners), 1962 (winners), 1963 (winners)
