= Norman Wood (golfer) =

Scottish professional golfer (1947–2023)

Personal information
- Full name: Norman David Wood
- Nationality: Scotland
- Born: 8 January 1947 Prestonpans, East Lothian, Scotland
- Died: 17 May 2023 (aged 76) Guernsey, Channel Islands
- Height: 5 ft 10 in (1.78 m)

Career
- Sport: Golf
- Turned professional: 1965
- Former tours: European Tour; European Seniors Tour
- Professional wins: 5

Number of wins by tour
- European Tour: 1
- Other: 4

Best results in major championships
- Masters Tournament: DNP
- PGA Championship: DNP
- U.S. Open: DNP
- The Open Championship: T40: 1975

Norman David Wood (8 January 1947 – 17 May 2023) was a Scottish professional golfer. He won the 1972 Italian Open and played in the 1975 Ryder Cup.

== Professional career ==
Wood turned professional in 1965 and was an assistant at Turnberry. He won the Scottish Assistants' Championship in 1968, beating David Webster in a playoff.

Wood played on the European Tour in the 1970s. His sole win on the European Tour came at the 1972 Italian Open where he beat Brian Huggett by two strokes. He also played outside of Europe during the off-season, winning the Jamaica Open in December 1973. In March 1973 he lost to Ben Arda in a playoff for the Singapore Open and at the 1974 Australian Open he was runner-up to Gary Player.

In 1975 Wood finished a career-best 18th on the Order of Merit and played in the Ryder Cup. Wood had a good start to the season, finishing joint runner-up in the Madrid Open, an event reduced to 36 holes by bad weather. He was also sixth in the Portuguese Open and the French Open and 14th in the Penfold PGA Championship. The good results at the start of the season put Wood in the top eight of the Ryder Cup points to gain an automatic place in team. The 1975 Ryder Cup was held at Laurel Valley Golf Club in September. Wood lost his two pairs matches but defeated Lee Trevino 2&1 in his singles match. In 1975 Wood also lost to David Huish in a playoff for the Scottish Professional Championship and made his one appearance for Scotland in the World Cup that year, playing with Brian Barnes, after Bernard Gallacher withdrew.

In May 1976 Wood, playing with Maurice Bembridge, lost in a playoff for the Sumrie-Bournemouth Better-Ball. Wood and Bembridge held a 5 stroke lead after 54 holes but were caught by Eamonn Darcy and Christy O'Connor Jnr who had a final round 62. Darcy and O'Connor won the playoff at the third extra hole after Darcy holed a 40-foot putt. After 1976 Wood's performances dropped off and he played less on the European Tour.

Back problems forced Wood to become a club professional. He worked at the Sandy Lane resort in Barbados starting in 1978 and the Royal Guernsey Golf Club in Guernsey from 1982 until retiring at the end of 2007.

After turning 50, Wood played part-time on the European Seniors Tour for several seasons from 1997 to 2006. His best result was to finish in solo third place in the 1997 Manadens Affarer Seniors Open in Sweden.

== Death ==
Wood died in Guernsey on 17 May 2023 at the age of 76.

== Professional wins (5) ==
=== European Tour wins (1) ===
No.	Date	Tournament	Winning score	Margin of victory	Runner-up
1	15 Oct 1972	Italian Open	−1 (65-69-68-69=271)	2 strokes	(Wales) Brian Huggett

=== Other wins (4) ===
- 1968 Scottish Assistants' Championship
- 1969 Scottish Coca-Cola Tournament
- 1970 Scottish Coca-Cola Tournament
- 1973 Jamaica Open

== Playoff record ==
Asia Golf Circuit playoff record (0–1)

No.	Year	Tournament	Opponent	Result
1	1973	Singapore Open	(Philippines) Ben Arda	Lost to par on third extra hole

== Results in major championships ==
Tournament	1970	1971	1972	1973	1974	1975	1976	1977
The Open Championship	T50	CUT	T50	CUT	T54	T40	CUT	CUT

Note: Wood only played in The Open Championship.
CUT = missed the half-way cut
"T" = tied

== Team appearances ==
- Ryder Cup (representing Great Britain and Ireland): 1975
- World Cup (representing Scotland): 1975
- Double Diamond International (representing Scotland): 1972, 1975, 1976
