= Bob Murphy (golfer) =

American professional golfer (born 1943)

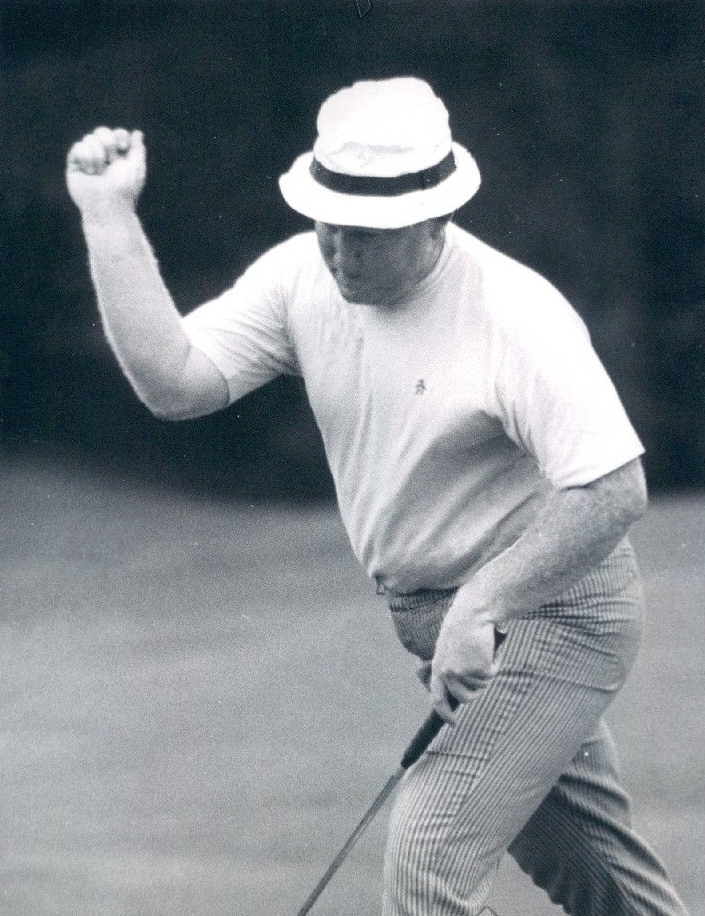
- Murphy at the 1968 Westchester Classic

Personal information
- Full name: Robert Joseph Murphy Jr.
- Nationality: United States
- Born: February 14, 1943 (age 83) Brooklyn, New York, U.S.
- Height: 5 ft 10 in (1.78 m)
- Weight: 205 lb (93 kg; 14.6 st)
- Spouse: Gail

Career
- Sport: Golf
- College: University of Florida
- Turned professional: 1967
- Current tour: Champions Tour
- Former tour: PGA Tour
- Professional wins: 23

Number of wins by tour
- PGA Tour: 5
- PGA Tour Champions: 11
- Other: 8

Best results in major championships
- Masters Tournament: T13: 1971
- PGA Championship: T2: 1970
- U.S. Open: T3: 1975
- The Open Championship: T48: 1976

Achievements and awards
- Senior PGA Tour Rookie of the Year: 1993

Robert Joseph Murphy Jr. (born February 14, 1943) is an American professional golfer who was formerly a member of the PGA Tour and currently plays on the Champions Tour. Murphy has won 21 tournaments as a professional.

== Early life ==
In 1943, Murphy was born in Brooklyn, New York. He was a standout pitcher in his youth, and as a teen led his high school baseball team to the state championship in 1960. After suffering a football injury (which also ended his baseball career), Murphy got started in golf.

== Amateur career ==
Murphy attended the University of Florida in Gainesville, Florida He was a member of Sigma Alpha Epsilon fraternity (Florida Upsilon Chapter). While he was an undergraduate, he played for coach Buster Bishop's Florida Gators men's golf team in National Collegiate Athletic Association (NCAA) competition from 1964 to 1966. While he was a college student, Murphy won the 1965 U.S. Amateur and the 1966 individual NCAA championship. He was also recognized as an All-American in 1966. In 1966, Murphy graduated from the University of Florida with a bachelor's degree in health and human performance.

== Professional career ==
In 1967, Murphy turned professional. He won five tournaments on the PGA Tour. He was a member of the victorious U.S. team in the 1975 Ryder Cup competition. His best finish in a major tournament was a second-place tie at the 1970 PGA Championship. Murphy won 11 times on the Senior PGA Tour.

=== Broadcasting career ===
Murphy first got into broadcasting while still playing. He joined CBS Sports as a tower announcer in 1984, working for CBS through 1991. He then joined ESPN as a color commentator, where he stayed through 1994. After a break from TV to play on the Senior PGA Tour, he joined NBC Sports in November 1999, and was a tower announcer for the PGA Tour on NBC through 2009, at which point he retired.

== Personal life ==
Murphy lives in Delray Beach, Florida with his wife, Gail.

== Awards and honors ==
- In 1966, Murphy earned All-American while at the University of Florida.
- In 1971, he was inducted into the University of Florida Athletic Hall of Fame as a "Gator Great."
- In 1993, Murphy earned Senior PGA Tour Rookie of the Year honors.
- In 2011, he was inducted into the Florida Sports Hall of Fame.

== Amateur wins ==
- 1965 U.S. Amateur
- 1966 NCAA championship (individual)

== Professional wins (23) ==
=== PGA Tour wins (5) ===
No.	Date	Tournament	Winning score	Margin of victory	Runner(s)-up
1	Aug 25, 1968	Philadelphia Golf Classic	−12 (69-71-66-70=276)	Playoff	(United States) Labron Harris Jr.
2	Sep 2, 1968	Thunderbird Classic	−11 (68-70-71-69=277)	3 strokes	(Australia) Bruce Crampton, (United States) Bob Lunn
3	Sep 7, 1970	Greater Hartford Open Invitational	−17 (66-66-66-69=267)	4 strokes	(United States) Paul Harney
4	Mar 2, 1975	Jackie Gleason-Inverrary Classic	−15 (68-71-66-68=273)	1 stroke	(United States) Eddie Pearce
5	Jun 29, 1986	Canadian Open	−8 (71-70-68-71=280)	3 strokes	(Australia) Greg Norman

PGA Tour playoff record (1–5)

No.	Year	Tournament	Opponent(s)	Result
1	1968	Philadelphia Golf Classic	(United States) Labron Harris Jr.	Won with birdie on third extra hole
2	1970	Tucson Open	(United States) Lee Trevino	Lost to birdie on first extra hole
3	1972	Hawaiian Open	(United States) Grier Jones	Lost to par on first extra hole
4	1973	Westchester Classic	(United States) Bobby Nichols	Lost to birdie on second extra hole
5	1974	World Open Golf Championship	(United States) Frank Beard, (United States) Jack Nicklaus, (United States) Johnny Miller	Miller won with birdie on second extra hole Murphy eliminated by par on first hole
6	1981	Tallahassee Open	(United States) Dave Eichelberger, (United States) Mark O'Meara	Eichelberger won with birdie on first extra hole

=== Australian wins (1) ===
- 1972 Wills Masters

=== Other wins (3) ===
- 1967 Florida Open
- 1979 Jerry Ford Invitational
- 1980 South Florida PGA Championship

=== Senior PGA Tour wins (11) ===
No.	Date	Tournament	Winning score	Margin of victory	Runner(s)-up
1	Aug 29, 1993	Bruno's Memorial Classic	−13 (69-67-67=203)	1 stroke	(New Zealand) Bob Charles, (United States) Lee Trevino
2	Sep 12, 1993	GTE North Classic	−10 (68-66=134)*	2 strokes	(United States) Jim Ferree, (United States) Dave Hill, (United States) Chi-Chi Rodríguez
3	Oct 16, 1994	Raley's Senior Gold Rush	−8 (69-71-68=208)	Playoff	(United States) Dave Eichelberger
4	Oct 30, 1994	Hyatt Regency Maui Kaanapali Classic	−18 (62-67-66=195)	2 strokes	(United States) Jack Kiefer
5	Feb 12, 1995	IntelliNet Challenge	−7 (67-70=137)*	1 stroke	(United States) Raymond Floyd
6	May 7, 1995	PaineWebber Invitational	−13 (68-66-69=203)	2 strokes	(United States) Raymond Floyd, (United States) Larry Ziegler
7	Jun 25, 1995	Nationwide Championship	−13 (71-64-68=203)	2 strokes	(United States) Hale Irwin, (United States) Bruce Summerhays
8	Aug 6, 1995	VFW Senior Championship	−15 (69-63-63=195)	1 stroke	(United States) Jim Colbert
9	Feb 4, 1996	Royal Caribbean Classic	−10 (69-67-67=203)	4 strokes	(United States) Hale Irwin
10	May 19, 1996	Cadillac NFL Golf Classic	−14 (62-71-69=202)	2 strokes	(United States) Jay Sigel
11	Mar 6, 1997	Toshiba Senior Classic	−6 (65-70-72=207)	Playoff	(United States) Jay Sigel

*Note: Tournament shortened to 36 holes due to weather.

Senior PGA Tour playoff record (2–1)

No.	Year	Tournament	Opponent	Result
1	1994	Raley's Senior Gold Rush	(United States) Dave Eichelberger	Won with bogey on fifth extra hole
2	1995	Senior British Open	(Scotland) Brian Barnes	Lost to eagle on third extra hole
3	1997	Toshiba Senior Classic	(United States) Jay Sigel	Won with birdie on ninth extra hole

=== Other senior wins (3) ===
- 1995 Diners Club Matches (with Jim Colbert)
- 1996 Diners Club Matches (with Jim Colbert)
- 2013 Liberty Mutual Insurance Legends of Golf - Demaret Division (with Jim Colbert)

== Results in major championships ==
Tournament	1966	1967	1968	1969
Masters Tournament	T59 LA	52 LA		CUT
U.S. Open	T15 LA	T23	T32	5
The Open Championship				
PGA Championship				T63

Tournament	1970	1971	1972	1973	1974	1975	1976	1977	1978	1979
Masters Tournament	T23	T13	T43			42	T28	T31		
U.S. Open	CUT	CUT	T63	T20		T3	CUT		CUT	T25
The Open Championship							T48			
PGA Championship	T2	T46	T40	T35	T32	T25	CUT	T25	T54	CUT

Tournament	1980	1981	1982	1983	1984	1985	1986	1987
Masters Tournament								CUT
U.S. Open	CUT			T50			CUT	
The Open Championship								
PGA Championship	T20	18	T34		CUT	T62	69	

Top 10
Did not play

LA = Low amateur
CUT = missed the half-way cut
"T" indicates a tie for a place

=== Summary ===
Tournament	Wins	2nd	3rd	Top-5	Top-10	Top-25	Events	Cuts made
Masters Tournament	0	0	0	0	0	2	10	8
U.S. Open	0	0	1	2	2	6	15	9
The Open Championship	0	0	0	0	0	0	1	1
PGA Championship	0	1	0	1	1	5	17	14
Totals	0	1	1	3	3	13	43	32

- Most consecutive cuts made – 11 (1971 PGA – 1976 Masters)
- Longest streak of top-10s – 1 (three times)

== Results in The Players Championship ==
Tournament	1974	1975	1976	1977	1978	1979	1980	1981	1982	1983	1984	1985	1986	1987
The Players Championship	T6	T4	T43		CUT	71	T64	CUT	CUT	T32	CUT		T14	T44

Top 10
Did not play

CUT = missed the halfway cut
"T" indicates a tie for a place

== U.S. national team appearances ==
Amateur

- Walker Cup: 1967 (winners)
- Eisenhower Trophy: 1966

Professional

- Ryder Cup: 1975 (winners)

== See also ==
- 1967 PGA Tour Qualifying School graduates
- List of American Ryder Cup golfers
- List of Florida Gators men's golfers on the PGA Tour
- List of golfers with most PGA Tour Champions wins
- List of Sigma Alpha Epsilon members
- List of University of Florida alumni
- List of University of Florida Athletic Hall of Fame members
