= 1996 Senior British Open =

Tournament information
- Dates: 25–28 July 1996
- Location: Portrush, County Antrim, Northern Ireland, United Kingdom; 55.200°N 6.635°W
- Courses: Royal Portrush Golf Club; Dunluce Links
- Organised by: The R&A
- Tours: European Seniors Tour; Senior PGA Tour
- Format: 72 holes stroke play

Statistics
- Par: 72
- Length: 6,690 yd (6,120 m)
- Field: 105 players, 61 after cut
- Cut: 150 (+6)
- Prize fund: €352,665 £350,000
- Winner's share: €81,662

Champion
- (Scotland) Brian Barnes
- 277 (−11)
- Location in Europe Location in the United Kingdom Location in Ireland Location in Northern Ireland

The 1996 Senior British Open was a professional golf tournament for players aged 50 and above and the tenth British Senior Open Championship, held from 25 to 28 July at Royal Portrush Golf Club in Portrush, County Antrim, Northern Ireland, United Kingdom.

In 2018, the tournament was, as all Senior British Open Championships played 1987–2002, retroactively recognized as a senior major golf championship and a PGA Tour Champions (at the time named the Senior PGA Tour) event.

Brian Barnes won by three strokes over Bob Charles and David Oakley to successfully defend his title from 1995 and win his second Senior British Open title and senior major championship victory.

== Venue ==
The event was the second Senior Open Championship in a row held at Royal Portrush Golf Club.

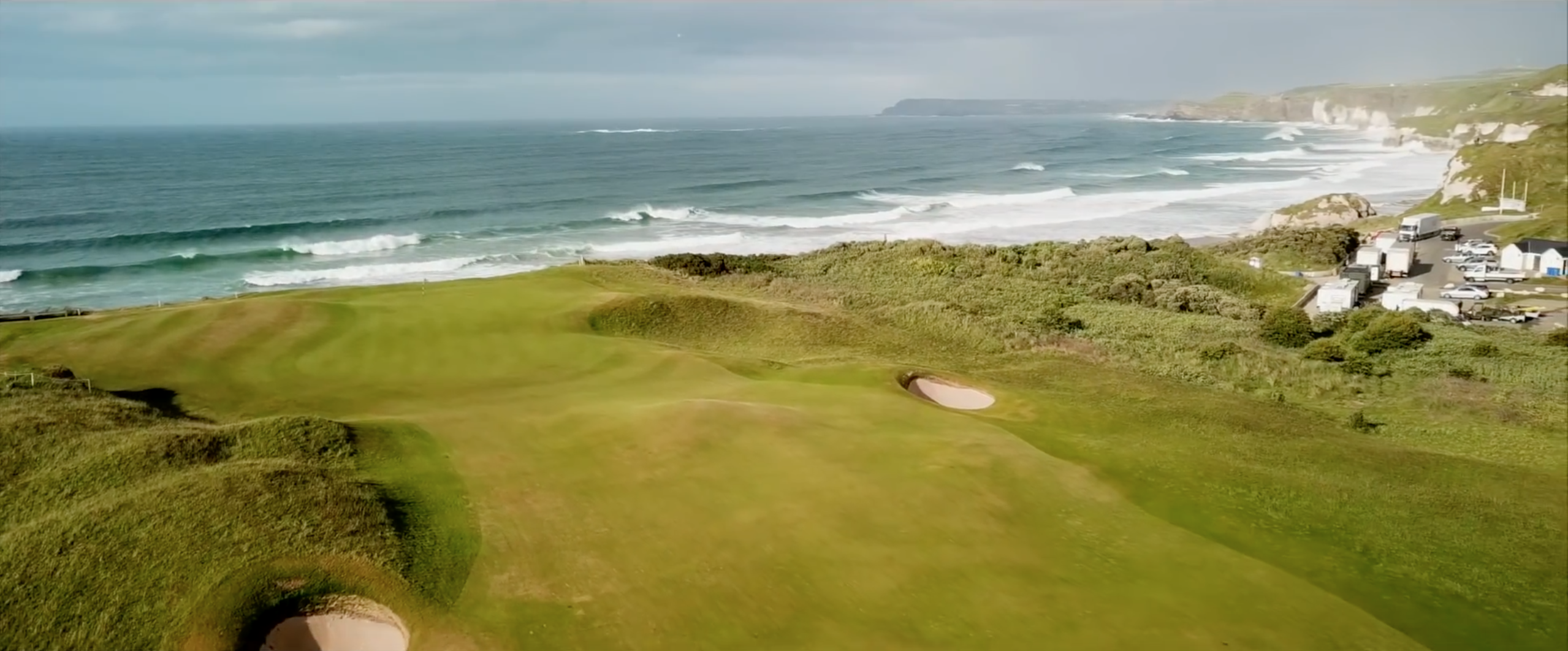
Royal Portrush GC 5th hole

== Field ==
105 players entered the competition. One of them withdrew. 61 players, all of them professionals, no amateurs, made the 36-hole cut. One of them was disqualified.

=== Past champions in the field ===
Seven past Senior British Open champions participated. Six of them made the 36-hole cut. Bobby Verway missed the cut by one shot.

Player	Country	Year(s) won	R1	R2	R3	R4	Total	To par	Finish
Brian Barnes	England	1995	72	65	66	74	277	−11	1
Bob Charles	New Zealand	1989, 1993	68	69	69	74	280	−8	T2
Tom Wargo	United States	1994	68	70	76	72	286	−2	T7
Neil Coles	England	1987	67	70	74	76	287	−1	9
Gary Player	South Africa	1988, 1990	70	76	69	77	292	+4	T14
John Fourie	South Africa	1992	71	74	79	78	302	+14	T47

=== Past winners and runners-up at The Open Championship in the field ===
The field included two former winners of The Open Championship, Bob Charles (tied 2nd) and Gary Player (tied 14th).

The field also included three former runners-up at The Open Championship. Neil Coles (9th), Brian Huggett (tied 18th) and Christy O'Connor Snr (tied 32nd).

== Final results ==
Sunday, 28 July 1996

Place	Player	Score	To par	Money (€)
1	(Scotland) Brian Barnes	72-65-66-74=277	−11	81,662
T2	(New Zealand) Bob Charles	68-69-69-74=280	−8	42,532
T2	(United States) David Oakley	71-68-69-72=280	−8	42,532
4	(England) Tommy Horton	68-74-69-70=281	−7	24,500
5	(England) John Morgan	70-71-72-70=283	−5	20,776
6	(England) Malcolm Gregson	67-74-69-75=285	−3	17,150
7	(Spain) Antonio Garrido	72-69-72-73=286	−2	13,475
7	(United States) Tom Wargo	68-70-76-72=286	−2	13,475
9	(England) Neil Coles	67-70-74-76=287	−1	10,976
10	(United States) Chick Evans	70-70-76-72=288	E	9,800

Preceded by 1996 Ford Senior Players Championship	Senior Major Championships	Succeeded by 1997 The Tradition Presented by Countrywide
