= Cutty Sark Tournament =

Tournament information
- Location: Scotland
- Established: 1964
- Format: stroke play
- Final year: 1972

The Cutty Sark Tournament was a golf tournament that was played from 1964 to 1972. It was a 72-hole stroke-play event, played in Scotland. John Panton won the event three times in the first four years. The event was sponsored by the owners of Cutty Sark whisky.

== Winners ==
Year	Winner	Score	Margin of victory	Runner(s)-up	Winner's share (£)	Venue	Ref
1964	(Scotland) John Panton	266	7 strokes	(Northern Ireland) Norman Drew	100	Cowglen	
1965	(Scotland) John Panton	275	1 stroke	(Scotland) Alex Fox	200	Williamwood	
1966	(Scotland) Eric Brown	282	6 strokes	(Scotland) John Panton	200	Whitecraigs	
1967	(Scotland) John Panton	278	2 strokes	(Scotland) Eric Brown	200	East Renfrewshire	
1968	(Scotland) Gordon Cunningham	267	7 strokes	(Scotland) Harry Bannerman	200	Pollok	
1969	(Scotland) Bobby Walker	269	2 strokes	(Scotland) Eric Brown	200	Haggs Castle	
1970	(Scotland) Harry Bannerman	273	5 strokes	(Scotland) Campbell Craig (Scotland) David Huish (Scotland) Frank Rennie (Scotland) Jack Steven	200	East Renfrewshire	
1971	(Scotland) Frank Rennie	273	1 stroke	(Scotland) David Ingram	200	Pollok	
1972						East Renfrewshire	
