= Marshall Douglas =

Scottish golfer

Marshall C. Douglas is a Scottish golfer. He played in four Open Championships; 1966, 1967, 1970 and 1972. Douglas won the inaugural 1969 Nigerian Open, and was third in 1970. He was runner-up in the 1966 Northern Open, in the 1969 Scottish Uniroyal Tournament and in the 1974 Scottish Coca-Cola Tournament. Douglas also won the Elie Boys in 1957 and the Eastwood Quaich 1962. In September 1973, Douglas won with scores of 70 and 68 at Dalmahoy, the Pro-Am Championship of Scotland sponsored by Scottish Sunday Express and Royal Bank of Scotland.
