= 1995 Senior British Open =

Tournament information
- Dates: 27–30 July 1995
- Location: Portrush, County Antrim, Northern Ireland, United Kingdom; 55.200°N 6.635°W
- Courses: Royal Portrush Golf Club; Dunluce Links
- Organised by: The R&A
- Tours: European Seniors Tour; Senior PGA Tour
- Format: 72 holes stroke play

Statistics
- Par: 72
- Length: 6,690 yd (6,120 m)
- Field: 133 players, 65 after cut
- Cut: 152 (+8)
- Prize fund: €352,665 £350,000
- Winner's share: €81,662

Champion
- (Scotland) Brian Barnes
- 281 (−7)
- Location in Europe Location in the United Kingdom Location in Ireland Location in Northern Ireland

The 1995 Senior British Open was a professional golf tournament for players aged 50 and above and the ninth British Senior Open Championship, held from 27 to 30 July at Royal Portrush Golf Club in Portrush, County Antrim, Northern Ireland, United Kingdom.

In 2018, the tournament was, as all Senior British Open Championships played 1987–2002, retroactively recognized as a senior major golf championship and a PGA Tour Champions (at the time named the Senior PGA Tour) event.

Brian Barnes won in a playoff over Bob Murphy to win his first Senior British Open title and first senior major championship victory.

== Venue ==
The event was the first Senior Open Championship held at Royal Portrush Golf Club.

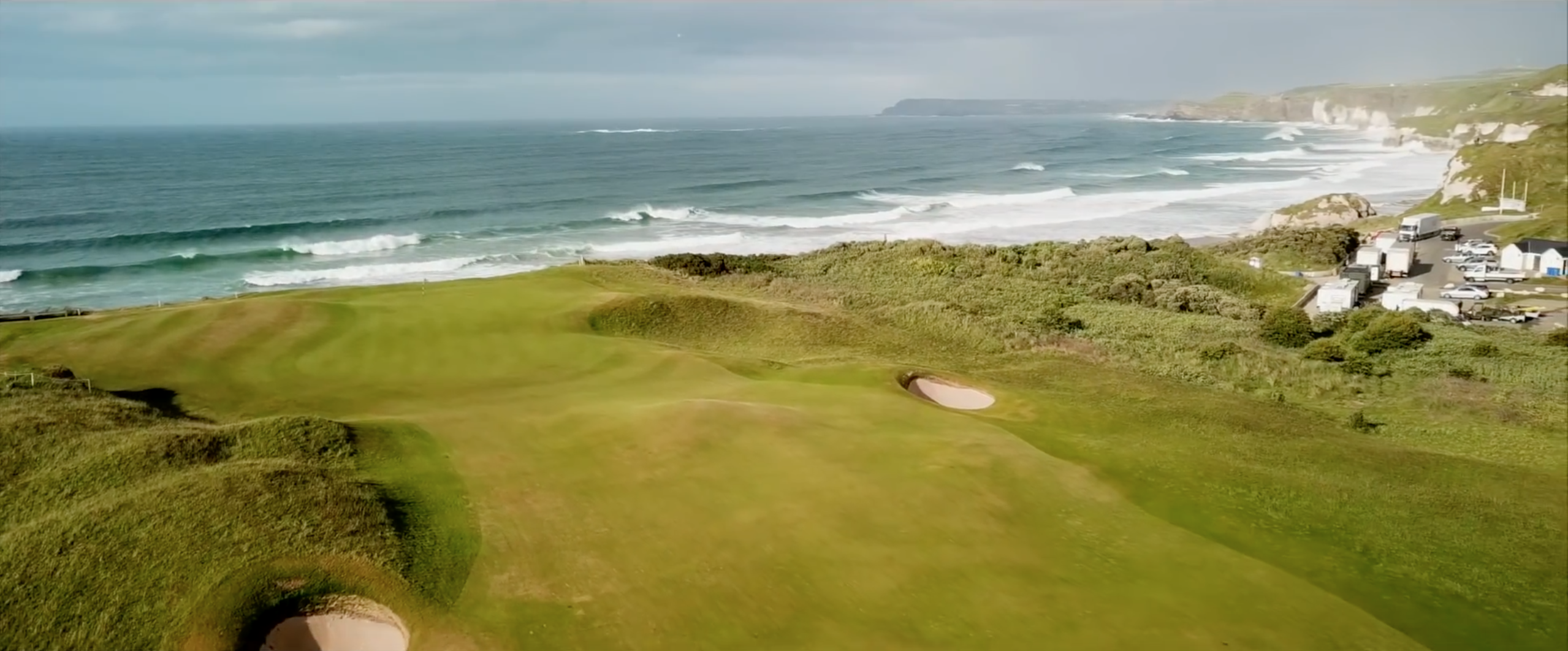
Royal Portrush GC 5th hole

== Field ==
133 players entered the competition. 65 players, all of them professionals, no amateurs, made the 36-hole cut.

=== Past champions in the field ===
Six past Senior British Open champions participated. Six of them made the 36-hole cut. Bobby Verway withdrew.

Player	Country	Year(s) won	R1	R2	R3	R4	Total	To par	Finish
Bob Charles	New Zealand	1989, 1993	70	73	73	66	280	−6	T3
John Fourie	South Africa	1992	70	71	73	69	283	−5	T5
Tom Wargo	United States	1994	75	71	69	75	290	+2	12
Neil Coles	England	1987	72	75	74	71	292	+4	T15
Gary Player	South Africa	1988, 1990	77	69	75	75	296	+8	T24

=== Past winners and runners-up at The Open Championship in the field ===
The field included three former winners of The Open Championship, Bob Charles (tied 3rd), Gary Player (tied 24th) and Arnold Palmer (tied 32nd).

The field also included three former runners-up at The Open Championship; Brian Huggett (10th), Neil Coles (tied 15th) and Christy O'Connor Snr (tied 39th).

== Final round and playoff summaries ==
=== Final round ===
Sunday, 30 July 1995

Brian Barnes and Bob Murphy tied the lead after the fourth round, to meet in a sudden death playoff, to decide the winner.

Defending champion Tom Wargo finished 12th nine strokes behind the leaders.

Place	Player	Score	To par	Money (€)
T1	(Scotland) Brian Barnes	67-67-77-70=281	−7	Playoff
T1	(United States) Bob Murphy	68-69-73-71=281	−7	Playoff
T3	(New Zealand) Bob Charles	70-73-73-66=282	−6	27,587
T3	(England) John Morgan	71-68-75-68=282	−6	27,587
5	(South Africa) John Fourie	70-71-73-69=283	−5	18,959
5	(England) Tommy Horton	78-68-67-70=283	−5	18,959
7	(United States) John Jacobs	76-72-68-66=284	−4	14,700
8	(United States) Larry Laoretti	68-71-75-69=285	−3	12,250
9	(South Africa) Hugh Inggs	71-72-72-70=287	−1	10,976
10	(Wales) Brian Huggett	72-70-74-69=288	E	9,800

=== Playoff ===
Sunday, 30 July 1995

The sudden-death playoff, to be played until one of the players had a lower score on a hole than the other, went on to the par-5 17th hole, then the par-4 18th hole and then the 17th hole again. 50-year-old Brian Barnes beat Bob Murphy with an eagle at the third extra hole.

Place	Player	Score	To par	Money (€)
1	(Scotland) Brian Barnes	5-4-3	−2	81,662
2	(United States) Bob Murphy	5-4-x	E	54,390

Preceded by 1995 Ford Senior Players Championship	Senior Major Championships	Succeeded by 1996 The Tradition Presented by Countrywide
