= Scottish Uniroyal Tournament =

Tournament information
- Location: Scotland
- Established: 1969
- Format: stroke play
- Final year: 1975

The Scottish Uniroyal Tournament was a golf tournament that was played from 1969 to 1975. It was a 72-hole stroke-play event, played in Scotland. In 1976 and 1977 Uniroyal sponsored a European Tour event, the Uniroyal International.

== Winners ==
Year	Winner	Score	Margin of victory	Runner-up	Winner's share (£)	Venue	Ref
1969	(Scotland) Gordon Cunningham	270	3 strokes	(England) Marshall Douglas	300	Bruntsfield Links	
1970	(Scotland) Bobby Walker	276	2 strokes	(England) Doug McClelland	400	Bruntsfield Links	
1971	(Scotland) David Huish	282	4 strokes	(England) John Garner	400	East Kilbride	
1972	(England) Lionel Platts	278	3 strokes	(England) Peter Oosterhuis	400	East Kilbride	
1973	(Scotland) David Ingram	275	3 strokes	(Scotland) John McTear	400	Ladybank	
1974	(Scotland) Harry Bannerman (Scotland) John McTear	272	Tied	–	350 (each)	Lanark	
1975	(Scotland) Sam Torrance	269	3 strokes	(Scotland) David Huish	400	Lanark	

After 1975 a 36-hole event was held, won by John Chillas in 1976, Bill Murray in 1977 and Bob Jamieson in 1978.
