= Skol Tournament =

Tournament information
- Location: Scotland
- Established: 1970
- Format: stroke play
- Final year: 1983

The Skol Tournament was a golf tournament that was played from 1970 to 1983. It was a limited-field 72-hole stroke-play event, played in Scotland. It was played over three days, with the first two days being a pro-am, the professionals playing 36 holes on the final day. Initially the field consisted of 12 professionals, increasing to 14 in 1975, 20 in 1979 and 25 in 1982.

== Winners ==
Year	Winner	Score	Margin of victory	Runner(s)-up	Winner's share (£)	Venue	Ref
1970	(Scotland) George Will	275	1 stroke	(Scotland) Bernard Gallacher	400	Haggs Castle	
1971	(Scotland) Harry Bannerman	268	1 stroke	(Scotland) David Huish	350	Williamwood	
1972	(Scotland) Ronnie Shade	263	8 strokes	(Scotland) Harry Bannerman	500	Williamwood	
1973	(Scotland) Ronnie Shade	266	4 strokes	(Scotland) Harry Bannerman	500	Williamwood	
1974	(Scotland) Andrew Brooks	259	4 strokes	(Scotland) Bernard Gallacher	1,000	Williamwood	
1975	(Scotland) Ronnie Shade	269	1 stroke	(Scotland) Andrew Brooks (Scotland) David Ingram	1,000	Williamwood	
1976	Not held						
1977	(Scotland) Brian Barnes	270	6 strokes	(Scotland) David Ingram (Scotland) Derek Small	1,000	Cowglen	
1978	(Scotland) Brian Barnes	268	3 strokes	(Scotland) Alistair Thomson	1,000	Cowglen	
1979	(Scotland) Sam Torrance	265	2 strokes	(Scotland) Brian Barnes	1,250	Cowglen	
1980	(Scotland) Brian Barnes	275	4 strokes	(Scotland) Bill Longmuir	1,500	Duddingston	
1981	(Scotland) David Matthew	264	2 strokes	(Scotland) Bernard Gallacher (Scotland) Sam Torrance	1,750	Cowglen	
1982	(Scotland) Sam Torrance	263	1 stroke	(Scotland) Russell Weir	2,000	Cowglen	
1983	(Scotland) Ross Drummond	273	1 stroke	(Scotland) Sam Torrance	2,000	Cowglen	
