= Bobby Walker (golfer) =

Scottish golfer (1943–1995)

Personal information
- Full name: Robert Taylor Walker
- Nationality: Scotland
- Born: 11 April 1943 Wigton, Cumberland, England
- Died: October 1995 (aged 52) Montrose, Scotland

Career
- Sport: Golf
- Turned professional: 1959
- Former tour: European Tour
- Professional wins: 9

Best results in major championships
- Masters Tournament: DNP
- PGA Championship: DNP
- U.S. Open: DNP
- The Open Championship: T43: 1966

Robert Taylor Walker (11 April 1943 – October 1995) was a Scottish professional golfer. He won the Scottish Professional Championship twice and was runner-up in the PGA Close Championship in 1962 and a semi-finalist in the 1970 PGA Match Play Championship. He represented Scotland in the 1964 Canada Cup. He played in the Open Championship nine times, making the cut three times.

== Amateur career ==
Walker played for Scotland in the annual England–Scotland boys match from 1957 to 1959, making his debut at the age of 14. In 1958 he was also selected for a combined England & Scotland boys team against the Continent of Europe. In April 1959 he reached the final of the Scottish boys' championship at North Berwick, losing 3&2 to Hugh Stuart. Later the same month he won the Carris Trophy beating Peter Jochums from Germany, in a three-hole playoff after they had tied on 152.

== Professional career ==
Walker turned professional in September 1959, becoming an assistant to his father at Downfield. In 1960 he played in the British Youths Open Championship at Pannal, finishing in 11th place. The under-21 event was open to assistant professionals as well as amateurs until 1962. Later in 1960 he won the Scottish Assistants' Championship, an event he was to win four years in succession. In 1961 Walker won the Scottish Professional Championship at Forres, becoming the youngest winner of the event. He finished with a score of 271, a record low for the event, two strokes ahead of John Panton. He played again in the British Youths Championship, at Bruntsfield Links. He was one stroke behind the leaders after three rounds but a final round 78 saw him finish in 7th place.

In early 1962 Walker played on the Far East Circuit. Returning to Britain he led the Coombe Hill Assistants' Tournament after two rounds but a poor finish left him tied for 5th place. In his defence of the Scottish Professional Championship at Dunbar he finished runner-up, two strokes behind Eric Brown. In the British Youths Open Championship at Pannal, he led after the first round and finished in 5th place. In April 1963 Walker was runner-up in the Schweppes PGA Close Championship at Royal Birkdale, two strokes behind Peter Butler. In 1964 Walker won the Scottish Professional Championship for a second time, at Machrihanish, winning by two strokes from Eric Brown. In December he represented Scotland with John Panton in the Canada Cup in Hawaii. They finished tied for 16th place. From 1965 Walker had a number of less successful years, although he did finish tied for 43rd place in the 1966 Open Championship at Muirfield, despite a final round of 80.

In early 1969 Walker played in a number of events in southern Africa. In February he finished fifth in the South African Open in Durban. In August he won the Cutty Sark Tournament at Haggs Castle, two strokes ahead of Eric Brown and collecting the first prize of £200. In 1970 Walker again played in a number of events in southern Africa and in February won the Western Province Open. He had some good performances in August and September. In August he won the Scottish Uniroyal Tournament.at Bruntsfield Links, by two strokes from Doug McClelland and taking the £400 first prize. Later in the month he reached the semi-finals of the Long John Scotch Whisky Match Play Championship at Moor Park, losing to Tommy Horton. but still collected £500. In September he made the cut in the Alcan International at Portmarnock and was the leading Scot in the W.D. & H.O. Wills Tournament at Dalmahoy, finishing in a tie for 6th place behind Tony Jacklin.

Walker played a few events on the European Tour from its founding in 1972 until 1974. He was in the Scottish team for the 1972 Double Diamond International at Pannal in September. His final event was the 1974 Benson & Hedges Match Play Championship, played at his home club, Downfield. He reached the last-32 before losing to David Llewellyn.

== Personal life ==
Walker was the son of Fred Walker, the professional at Downfield Golf Club in Dundee. Fred had been the first professional at Downfield in 1933 and was there, except during World War II, until his retirement in 1972. Fred was the ‘Club Professional of the year’ in 1969. Walker died in October 1995. He had been in South Africa for a number of years and then Canada before returning to Scotland at the end of his life. Walker's older sister, Margaret (born 1937), represented Scotland in the annual England–Scotland girls match in 1954 and 1955.

== Amateur wins ==
- 1959 Carris Trophy

== Professional wins (9) ==
- 1960 Scottish Assistants' Championship
- 1961 Scottish Professional Championship, Scottish Assistants' Championship
- 1962 Scottish Assistants' Championship
- 1963 Scottish Assistants' Championship
- 1964 Scottish Professional Championship
- 1969 Cutty Sark Tournament
- 1970 Western Province Open, Scottish Uniroyal Tournament

== Results in major championships ==
Tournament	1960	1961	1962	1963	1964	1965	1966	1967	1968	1969	1970	1971	1972	1973	1974
The Open Championship	CUT	CUT		45	CUT		T43		CUT	CUT			58		CUT

Note: Walker only played in The Open Championship.

Did not play

CUT = missed the half-way cut (3rd round cut in 1968 and 1969 Open Championships)
"T" indicates a tie for a place

== Team appearances ==
Amateur

- England–Scotland boys match (representing Scotland): 1957 (winners), 1958, 1959
- Boys' match v Continent of Europe (representing combined England & Scotland): 1958 (winners)

Professional

- Canada Cup (representing Scotland): 1964
- Double Diamond International (representing Scotland): 1972
