= Scottish Coca-Cola Tournament =

Tournament information
- Location: Scotland
- Established: 1967
- Format: stroke play
- Final year: 1983

The Scottish Coca-Cola Tournament was a golf tournament that was played from 1967 to 1983. It was a 72-hole stroke-play event, played in Scotland. David Huish won the event three times while Norman Wood, John Panton and Harry Bannerman each won in twice. Finlay Morris, the inaugural winner, died, aged 22, in a car accident three months after the event. From 1968 the Finlay Morris Memorial Trophy was awarded to leading player under the age of 25.

== Winners ==
Year	Winner	Score	Margin of victory	Runner(s)-up	Winner's share (£)	Venue	Ref
1967	(Scotland) Finlay Morris	262	15 strokes	(Scotland) David Huish	200	Haggs Castle	
1968	(Scotland) John Panton	276	1 stroke	(Scotland) Ian Smith	200	Haggs Castle	
1969	(Scotland) Norman Wood	204	3 strokes	(Scotland) John Panton (Scotland) John Semple	200	Whitecraigs	
1970	(Scotland) Norman Wood	272	2 strokes	(Scotland) David Huish	300	Whitecraigs	
1971	(Scotland) John Panton	271	2 strokes	(Scotland) Andrew Brooks	400	Whitecraigs	
1972	(Scotland) Harry Bannerman		8 strokes			Haggs Castle	
1973	(Scotland) Derek Small	268	1 stroke	(Scotland) David Huish	600	Whitecraigs	
1974	(Scotland) David Ingram	268	6 strokes	(Scotland) Marshall Douglas (Scotland) Bob Jamieson	450	Whitecraigs	
1975	(Scotland) David Huish	272	1 stroke	(Scotland) Frank Rennie	500	Cowglen	
1976	(Scotland) Harry Bannerman	284	Playoff	(Scotland) Sam Torrance	700	East Kilbride	
1977	(Scotland) David Huish	267	3 strokes	(Scotland) Jim Farmer	900	Broomieknowe	
1978	(Scotland) Alistair Thomson	280	2 strokes	(Scotland) John Chillas	1,000	Ayr Belleisle	
1979	(Scotland) David Huish	272	2 strokes	(Scotland) Ross Drummond	1,000	North Berwick	
1980	(Scotland) Ross Drummond	268	4 strokes	(Scotland) Brian Marchbank	1,500	Helensburgh	
1981	(Scotland) Jim Farmer	274	8 strokes	(Scotland) Robin Fyfe (Scotland) Bill Murray (Scotland) David Robertson	1,500	Ayr Belleisle	
1982	(Scotland) David Matthew	274	2 strokes	(Scotland) David Huish	1,500	Dalmahoy	
1983	(Scotland) Russell Weir	281	1 stroke	(Scotland) David Robertson	1,750	North Berwick	

The 1969 event was reduced to 54 holes by bad weather.
