= Johnnie Walker World Golf Championship =

The Johnnie Walker World Golf Championship was a golf event held at the Tryall Golf Club in Jamaica from 1991 to 1995.

The tournament was intended to be an official World Championship event to rival the four majors but was terminated after just five stagings.

== Winners ==
Year	Winner	Country	Margin of victory	Runner(s)-up	Ref
1991	Fred Couples	United States	4 strokes	(Germany) Bernhard Langer	
1992	Nick Faldo	England	Playoff	(Australia) Greg Norman	
1993	Larry Mize	United States	10 strokes	(United States) Fred Couples	
1994	Ernie Els	South Africa	6 strokes	(England) Nick Faldo, (United States) Mark McCumber	
1995	Fred Couples	United States	Playoff	(Fiji) Vijay Singh, (United States) Loren Roberts	
