= The Jamaica Classic =

Golf tournament formerly on the LPGA Tour

The Jamaica Classic was a golf tournament on the LPGA Tour from 1989 to 1991. It was played at the Tryall Golf Club in Jamaica.

== Winners ==
- 1991 Jane Geddes
- 1990 Patty Sheehan
- 1989 Betsy King
