= List of Sigma Alpha Epsilon chapters =

Sigma Alpha Epsilon was established at the University of Alabama on March 9, 1856, and has since grown to be an international fraternity. In the following list, active chapters are indicated in bold and inactive chapters and institutions are in italics.

Chapter	Charter date and range	Institution	City	Status	Ref.
**Alabama Mu (Mother Mu)**	March 9, 1856 – 1858; 1886–1888; 1892	University of Alabama	Tuscaloosa, Alabama	Active	
**Tennessee Nu (N)**	January 17, 1857 – 1861; 1870–1876; 1883–2019; 2024	Vanderbilt University	Nashville, Tennessee	Active	(Note: This school was established in 1806 as Cumberland College. It changed its name to the University of Nashville in 1826. In 1875 a financial crisis resulted in the school splitting into three entities: a preparatory school that exists today, the medical school which soon merged into Vanderbilt University, and the main, collegiate program, which was named the Peabody Normal School. After another financial crisis, in 1979, Peabody merged with Vanderbilt.)
**North Carolina Xi (Ξ)**	February 14, 1857 – 1861; 1885–1990; 1999	University of North Carolina at Chapel Hill	Chapel Hill, North Carolina	Active	
Georgia Pi (Π)	February 23, 1857 – 1865	Georgia Military Institute	Marietta, Georgia	Inactive	(Note: Georgia Military Institute was burned during the American Civil War and never reopened.)
**Tennessee Eta (H)**	July 4, 1857 – 1861; 1867–1872; 1887	Union University	Jackson, Tennessee	Active	
**Virginia Kappa**	December 12, 1857 – 1861; 1925–1977; 1983–2004; 2013	College of William & Mary	Williamsburg, Virginia	Active	(Note: Virginia Kappa was re-established in 1925 by absorbing Sigma Tau Delta (local), established in 1922. It was restored as a colony in 1982 and 2011.)
**Virginia Omicron**	December 19, 1857 – 1861; 1865–1879; 1885	University of Virginia	Charlottesville, Virginia	Active	
Kentucky Iota	April 1858–1861; 1977–1920	Bethel College	Russellville, Kentucky	Inactive	
**Texas Theta (Θ)**	October 1858–1861; 1877–2015; 2020	Baylor University	Waco, Texas	Active	(Note: Texas Theta was re-established in 1977 by absorbing Phi Kappa Alpha (local), established in 1972.)
**Washington City Rho**	November 8, 1858 – 1869; 1905	George Washington University	Washington, D.C.	Active	(Note: Chapter reformed in 1905 by absorbing Beta Lambda Beta, established in 1902.)
**Georgia Eta**	January 23, 1859 – 1863; 1976	Oglethorpe University	Brookhaven, Georgia	Active	(Note: Georgia Eta reformed in 1976 by absorbing Phi Alpha, established in 1967.)
Tennessee Lambda (Λ)	October 1860–1861, 1867–1878, 1885–1949, 1998– 2010	Cumberland University	Lebanon, Tennessee	Inactive	
**Virginia Upsilon**	October 1860–1861, 1971	Hampden–Sydney College	Hampden Sydney, Virginia	Active	(Note: Virginia Upsilon reformed in 1971 by absorbing Phi Alpha, established in 1969.)
Louisiana Tau	October 1860–1861	Centenary College of Louisiana	Shreveport, Louisiana	Inactive	
Kentucky Chi	December 1860–1861, 1874–1887	Kentucky Military Institute	Lyndon, Kentucky	Inactive	(Note: Kentucky Military Institute closed in 1971.)
**Georgia Beta**	December 31, 1865	University of Georgia	Athens, Georgia	Active	
**Mississippi Gamma**	January 1866–1869, 1880–1912, 1926–2017, 2020	University of Mississippi	Oxford, Mississippi	Active	
**Louisiana Epsilon**	January 1, 1867 – 1869; 1896–1998, 2005–2012, 2017	Louisiana State University	Baton Rouge, Louisiana	Active	(Note: Louisiana Epsilon was re-established in 1896 by absorbing Phi Alpha. It reformed as a colony in 2004 and 2015.)
Virginia Sigma	October 16, 1867 – 1886; 1900–2014	Washington and Lee University	Lexington, Virginia	Inactive	(Note: Chapter was suspended in 2014.)
**South Carolina Phi**	1868 Fall–1876, 1880–1885, 1889–1898, 1932–1963, 1984–2015, 2021	Furman University	Greenville, South Carolina	Active	
**Mississippi Zeta**	November 1869–1872	Mississippi College	Clinton, Mississippi	Active	
**Georgia Psi**	September 1870–1989, 1997	Mercer University	Macon, Georgia	Active	
**Alabama Beta-Beta**	December 5, 1870 – 1876	Howard College (now Samford University)	Homewood, Alabama	Active	
Virginia Theta	1874 Fall–1875, 1903–1911	Virginia Military Institute	Lexington, Virginia	Inactive	(Note: Virginia Theta was re-established in 1903 by absorbing Lambda Beta, established in 1902.)
North Carolina Rho-Rho	May 1876–1877	Carolina Military Institute	Charlotte, North Carolina	Inactive	
Kentucky Alpha (A)	December 1877–c. 1878	Forest Academy	Anchorage, Kentucky	Inactive	(Note: Forest Academy (also known as Forest Military Academy) is closed.)
**Alabama Alpha-Mu**	June 15, 1878 – 1880; 1886	Auburn University	Auburn, Alabama	Active	
Alabama Iota	November 23, 1878 – 1882; 1884-May 31, 2024	Birmingham–Southern College	Birmingham, Alabama	Closed	
**Tennessee Kappa (K)**	June 18, 1879 – 1881; 1890–2005; 2008	University of Tennessee	Knoxville, Tennessee	Active	
Georgia Delta	September 29, 1879 – 1888; 2007–2019	University of North Georgia	Dahlonega, Georgia	Inactive	
South Carolina Upsilon	April 9, 1881 – 1882; 1980–2006, 2010- January 2025	College of Charleston	Charleston, South Carolina	Inactive	
**Tennessee Omega (Ω)**	August 20, 1881	Sewanee: The University of the South	Sewanee, Tennessee	Active	
**Georgia Epsilon**	1881 Fall–1888, 1892	Emory University	Atlanta, Georgia	Active	
Texas Rho (I)	February 9, 1882 – 1884	Marvin College	Waxahachie, Texas	Inactive, Reassigned	(Note: Marvin College closed in 1884.)
**South Carolina Delta**	February 28, 1882 – 1897; 1911–1920; 1927	University of South Carolina	Columbia, South Carolina	Active	
Kentucky Kappa (I)	March 4, 1882 – 1890	Central University of Kentucky	Richmond, Kentucky	Moved	(Note: The Central University of Kentucky chapter was reformed at Centre College after the merger of the two colleges in 1901.)
**Kentucky Kappa (II)**	1893	Centre College	Danville, Kentucky	Active	
**Tennessee Zeta (Z)**	November 10, 1882	Rhodes College	Memphis, Tennessee	Active	
**North Carolina Theta**	May 20, 1883	Davidson College	Davidson, North Carolina	Active	
**Pennsylvania Delta**	June 4, 1883 – 1884; 1893–1895; 1905–1979; 1983	Gettysburg College	Gettysburg, Pennsylvania	Active	
South Carolina Lambda	December 13, 1883 – 1896	South Carolina Military Academy	Charleston, South Carolina	Inactive	
**Florida Upsilon**	February 11, 1884 – 1885; 1915	University of Florida	Gainesville, Florida	Active	(Note: Florida Upsilon was re-established in 1915 by absorbing Delta Pi Lambda, established in 1913.)
Virginia Pi	April 26, 1884 – 1895	Emory and Henry College	Emory, Virginia	Inactive	
**Missouri Alpha(A)**	May 27, 1884 – 1885; 1886–2008; 2016–2018; 2023	University of Missouri	Columbia, Missouri	Active	
**Texas Rho (II)**	1884–November 2017	University of Texas at Austin	Austin, Texas	Emerging chapter	(Note: Following its suspension by the university and national fraternity for hazing violations in 2017, the chapter withdrew and became a local fraternity called Texas Rho. In 2023, it reformed as an Emerging Chapter (colony).)
Virginia Tau	October 15, 1884 – 1887; 1937–2015	University of Richmond	Richmond, Virginia	Inactive	(Note: Virginia Tau was re-established in 1937 by absorbing Pi Delta Sigma, established in 1930.) (Note: Chapter was suspended in 2015.)
South Carolina Mu	November 29, 1884 – 1888; 1892–1894	Erskine College	Due West, South Carolina	Inactive	
Kentucky Alpha-Epsilon	February 5, 1885 – 1887	South Kentucky College	Hopkinsville, Kentucky	Inactive	
**Ohio Sigma**	April 4, 1885	University of Mount Union	Alliance, Ohio	Active	
**South Carolina Gamma**	October 16, 1885 – 1886; 1891–1911; 1923	Wofford College	Spartanburg, South Carolina	Active	(Note: South Carolina Gamma was re-established in 1923 by absorbing Delta Tau, established in 1921.)
Louisiana Zeta	September 9, 1886 – 1888	Thatcher Institute	Shreveport, Louisiana	Inactive	(Note: The Thatcher Institute is closed. This chapter had a total of 19 initiates.)
**Michigan Alpha(A)**	January 22, 1887	Adrian College	Adrian, Michigan	Active	(Note: Chapter formed by absorbing the Beta Iota (Prime) chapter of Delta Tau Delta, established in 1878.)
Pennsylvania Omega	March 5, 1887 – 1990; 1995–2013	Allegheny College	Meadville, Pennsylvania	Inactive	
Texas Theta (II)	March 7, 1887 – 1888	Buffalo Gap College	Buffalo Gap, Texas	Inactive	(Note: Buffalo Gap College was closed in 1902.)
**Mississippi Theta**	March 12, 1887 – 1892; 1932	Mississippi State University	Starkville, Mississippi	Active	(Note: Mississippi Theta was re-established in 1932 by absorbing Kappa Sigma Theta, established in 1927.)
Texas Psi	November 12, 1887 – 1888	Southwestern University	Georgetown, Texas	Inactive	
Ohio Delta	November 16, 1888 – 2010	Ohio Wesleyan University	Delaware, Ohio	Inactive	
**Michigan Iota-Beta**	January 12, 1889 – 2015; 2020	University of Michigan	Ann Arbor, Michigan	Active	
**Iowa Sigma**	May 25, 1889 – 1898; 1957	Simpson College	Indianola, Iowa	Active	(Note: Iowa Sigma was created by absorbing Phi Lambda Mu, established in 1888. It was re-established in 1957 by absorbing Phi Alpha, established in 1955.)
**Ohio Epsilon**	November 22, 1889	University of Cincinnati	Cincinnati, Ohio	Active	
**Georgia Phi**	March 8, 1890 –1891; 1892–200x ?; 2006	Georgia Tech	Atlanta, Georgia	Active	
Pennsylvania Sigma-Phi	October 11, 1890 – 2012	Dickinson College	Carlisle, Pennsylvania	Inactive	
**Colorado Chi**	April 11, 1891 – 1974; 1977–200x ?; 2003	University of Colorado Boulder	Boulder, Colorado	Active	
**New York Alpha(A)**	April 22, 1891 – 1895; 1898–2011; 2021	Cornell University	Ithaca, New York	Active	
Colorado Zeta	December 18, 1891 – 2015	University of Denver	Denver, Colorado	Inactive	
**Indiana Alpha(A)**	February 10, 1892	Franklin College	Franklin, Indiana	Active	
**California Alpha(A)**	March 5, 1892	Stanford University	Stanford, California	Active	
Massachusetts Beta-Upsilon	April 29, 1892 – 1972	Boston University	Boston, Massachusetts	Inactive	
**Missouri Beta**	April 30, 1892	Washington University in St. Louis	St. Louis, Missouri	Active	(Note: Chapter formed by absorbing the local group, Knights of the Green Emerald, established in 1890.)
**Pennsylvania Alpha-Zeta**	May 13, 1892	Pennsylvania State University	University Park, Pennsylvania	Active	
**Ohio Theta**	June 3, 1892	Ohio State University	Columbus, Ohio	Active	
Connecticut Alpha(A)	November 11, 1892 – 1899	Trinity College	Hartford, Connecticut	Inactive	
**Massachusetts Iota-Tau**	November 25, 1892 – 1999; 2011	Massachusetts Institute of Technology	Cambridge, Massachusetts	Active	
**Massachusetts Gamma**	March 17, 1893 – 1979; 2002	Harvard University	Cambridge, Massachusetts	Active	
**Indiana Beta**	May 18, 1893	Purdue University	West Lafayette, Indiana	Active	
**Nebraska Lambda-Pi**	May 26, 1893	University of Nebraska–Lincoln	Lincoln, Nebraska	Active	
**Pennsylvania Zeta**	June 14, 1893 – 2011; 2018	Bucknell University	Lewisburg, Pennsylvania	Active	
**Massachusetts Delta**	March 10, 1894	Worcester Polytechnic Institute	Worcester, Massachusetts	Active	
**Arkansas Alpha-Upsilon**	July 9, 1894	University of Arkansas	Fayetteville, Arkansas	Active	
**Illinois Psi-Omega**	October 17, 1894 – 1997; 2006	Northwestern University	Evanston, Illinois	Active	
**California Beta**	November 24, 1894 – 2015; 2017	University of California, Berkeley	Berkeley, California	Active	
New York Mu	February 21, 1895 – 1941; 1948–1961	Columbia University	New York City, New York	Inactive	(Note: Chapter formed by absorbing the local Manhattan Club, established in 1894. It was re-established as a colony in 1947.)
New York Sigma-Phi	February 21, 1895 – 1942	Bard College	Annandale-on-Hudson, New York	Inactive	(Note: Chapter formed by absorbing Sigma Phi, established in 1870.)
**Louisiana Tau Upsilon**	January 22, 1897	Tulane University	New Orleans, Louisiana	Active	(Note: Chapter formed by absorbing Phi Alpha, established in 1896.)
**Illinois Beta**	January 28, 1899 – 2005; 2011	University of Illinois Urbana-Champaign	Champaign and Urbana, Illinois	Active	(Note: Chapter formed by absorbing the local Red Ribbon Society, established in 1897. It was re-established as a colony in 2008.)
**Kentucky Epsilon**	February 10, 1900 – 2020; 2022	University of Kentucky	Lexington, Kentucky	Active	(Note: Chapter was formed by absorbing the local group, Rainbow E.S., established in 1895.) (Note: Chapter was suspended in 2020.)
**Pennsylvania Theta**	February 9, 1901	University of Pennsylvania	Philadelphia, Pennsylvania	Active	(Note: Chapter formed by absorbing Upsilon Pi, established in 1896.)
Maine Alpha(A)	February 22, 1901 – 2005; 20xx ?–2018	University of Maine	Orono, Maine	Inactive	(Note: Chapter formed by absorbing Iota Phi, established in 1898. It was re-established as a colony in 2008.) (Note: Chapter was suspended in 2018.)
**Minnesota Alpha(A)**	January 27, 1902 – 2015; 2018	University of Minnesota	Minneapolis and Saint Paul, Minnesota	Active	(Note: Chapter formed by absorbing Alpha Kappa Pi, established in 1900.)
**Colorado Lambda**	January 30, 1903	Colorado School of Mines	Golden, Colorado	Active	(Note: Chapter formed by absorbing the local group, the Lofters, established in 1901.)
**Wisconsin Alpha(A)**	February 7, 1903 – 2006; 2009	University of Wisconsin–Madison	Madison, Wisconsin	Active	(Note: Chapter formed by absorbing Phi Phi Phi, established in 1900. It was re-established as a colony in 2008.)
**Kansas Alpha(A)**	February 14, 1903 – 2018; 2022	University of Kansas	Lawrence, Kansas	Active	(Note: Chapter formed by absorbing Zeta Tau, established in 1901.)
Illinois Theta	March 9, 1903 – 1937; 1939–1941	University of Chicago	Chicago	Inactive	(Note: Chapter formed by absorbing Gamma Rho, established in 1902. It was re-established as a colony in 1938.)
**Iowa Beta**	February 11, 1905 – 1980; 1983–2012; 2016	University of Iowa	Iowa City, Iowa	Active	(Note: Chapter formed by absorbing Alpha Iota, established in 1904. It was re-established as a colony in 1982.)
**Ohio Rho**	February 18, 1905 – 2006; 2017	Case Western Reserve University	Cleveland, Ohio	Active	(Note: Chapter was formed by absorbing Sigma Rho, established in 1901. It was re-established as a colony in 2015.)
Iowa Gamma	June 3, 1905 – 2015	Iowa State University	Ames, Iowa	Inactive	(Note: Chapter was formed by absorbing the local group, Dragons, established in 1903.)
**Washington Alpha(A)**	May 30, 1906	University of Washington	Seattle, Washington	Active	(Note: Chapter formed by absorbing the local group, Klatow Club, established in 1904.)
**Indiana Gamma**	January 18, 1907 – 2002; 2009	Indiana University Bloomington	Bloomington, Indiana	Active	(Note: Chapter formed by absorbing the local group, Dywyki Society, established in 1902. It was re-established as a colony in 2007.)
New York Delta	February 22, 1907 – 1967; 1977–1980; 1988–2015	Syracuse University	Syracuse, New York	Inactive	(Note: Chapter formed by absorbing the local group, Orange Club, established in 1902. It was re-established in 1977 by absorbing Phi Alpha, established in 1968. It was also reformed as a colony in 1983.)
**New Hampshire Alpha(A)**	May 21, 1908 – 2016; 2023	Dartmouth College	Hanover, New Hampshire	Active	(Note: Chapter formed by absorbing Chi Tau Kappa, established in 1903.)
Oklahoma Kappa	October 23, 1909 – 1989; 1995–2015	University of Oklahoma	Norman, Oklahoma	Inactive	(Note: Chapter formed by absorbing Iota Tau, established in 1906. It was re-established as a colony in 1993.)
**Illinois Delta**	January 14, 1911	Millikin University	Decatur, Illinois	Active	(Note: Chapter was formed by absorbing Alpha Sigma Theta, established in 1904.)
**South Dakota Sigma**	January 27, 1911	University of South Dakota	Vermillion, South Dakota	Active	(Note: Chapter was formed by absorbing the local group, P. H. P., established in 1908.)
**Kansas Beta**	January 25, 1913	Kansas State University	Manhattan, Kansas	Active	(Note: Chapter formed by absorbing Phi Alpha Theta, established in 1906.)
**Pennsylvania Chi-Omicron**	March 10, 1913	University of Pittsburgh	Pittsburgh, Pennsylvania	Active	(Note: Chapter was formed by absorbing Chi Omicron, established in 1911.)
Wisconsin Phi	February 13, 1915 – 1973; 1984–1996	Beloit College	Beloit, Wisconsin	Inactive	(Note: Chapter formed by absorbing Phi Epsilon Pi, established in 1908. It was re-established as a colony in 1983.)
**Washington Beta**	March 9, 1915 – 2002; 2008	Washington State University	Pullman, Washington	Active	(Note: Chapter was formed by absorbing Phi Upsilon, established in 1908. It was re-established as a colony in 2006.)
**Oregon Alpha(A)**	March 19, 1915	Oregon State University	Corvallis, Oregon	Active	(Note: Chapter was established by absorbing Delta Omega, established in 1909.)
**Wyoming Alpha(A)**	January 26, 1917	University of Wyoming	Laramie, Wyoming	Active	(Note: Chapter was formed by absorbing Sigma Beta Phi, established in 1903.)
**Colorado Delta**	February 3, 1917 – 2006; 2013	Colorado State University	Fort Collins, Colorado|	Active	(Note: Chapter was formed by absorbing Sigma Theta Pi, established in 1911. It was re-established as a colony in 2012.)
**Arizona Alpha(A)**	March 2, 1917 – 1979; 198x ?–2018; 2023	University of Arizona	Tucson, Arizona	Active	(Note: Chapter was formed by absorbing Sigma Pi Alpha, established in 1913.)
**Nevada Alpha(A)**	March 9, 1917	University of Nevada, Reno	Reno, Nevada	Active	(Note: Chapter was formed by absorbing the local group, T.H.P.O., established in 1892.)
**New Hampshire Beta**	March 10, 1917 – 200x ?; 2009 - 2025	University of New Hampshire	Durham, New Hampshire	Inactive	(Note: Chapter was formed by absorbing Zeta Epsilon Zeta, established in 1894. It was re-established as a colony in 2007.)
New York Rho	September 26, 1919 – 1999	St. Lawrence University	Canton, New York	Inactive	(Note: Chapter was established by absorbing Chi Zeta Sigma, established in 1905.)
Ohio Mu	October 2, 1919 – 2001	Denison University	Granville, Ohio	Inactive	(Note: Chapter was established by absorbing Omega Pi Epsilon, established in 1913.)
**Ohio Tau**	October 4, 1919	Miami University	Oxford, Ohio	Active	(Note: Chapter was established by absorbing Phi Alpha Psi, established in 1910.)
**Pennsylvania Phi**	October 4, 1919	Carnegie Mellon University	Pittsburgh, Pennsylvania	Active	(Note: Chapter was formed by absorbing Zeta Lambda Epsilon, established in 1920.)
Pennsylvania Gamma	October 6, 1919 – 1997	Lafayette College	Easton, Pennsylvania	Inactive	(Note: Chapter was formed by absorbing the local group, Friars, established in 1908.)
**Montana Alpha(A)**	October 29, 1919 – 2018; 2022	Montana State University	Bozeman, Montana	Active	(Note: Chapter was formed by absorbing Kappa Nu, established in 1911. It was re-established as a colony in 2019.)
Idaho Alpha(A)	November 1, 1919 – 2018	University of Idaho	Moscow, Idaho	Inactive	(Note: Chapter was formed by absorbing Zeta Chi Alpha, established in 1916.)
**Oregon Beta**	November 8, 1919	University of Oregon	Eugene, Oregon	Active	(Note: Chapter was formed by absorbing the Avava Club, established in 1909.)
**Iowa Delta**	February 5, 1921	Drake University	Des Moines, Iowa	Active	(Note: Chapter was formed by absorbing Sigma Beta Kappa, established in 1910. Later, the chapter also absorbed Gamma Sigma Kappa.)
**California Gamma**	February 19, 1921 – 2014; 2023-	University of Southern California	Los Angeles, California	Active	(Note: Chapter was formed by absorbing Delta Beta Tau, established in 1912.)
**Texas Delta**	March 9, 1923	Southern Methodist University	Dallas, Texas	Active	(Note: Chapter was established by absorbing Phi Alpha, established in 1916.)
**North Dakota Alpha(A)**	April 13, 1923	University of North Dakota	Grand Forks, North Dakota	Active	(Note: Chapter was formed by absorbing Alpha Lambda Rho, established in 1912.)
**Montana Beta**	February 12, 1927	University of Montana	Missoula, Montana	Active	(Note: Chapter was formed by absorbing Sigma Alpha, established in 1919.)
**Michigan Gamma**	February 19, 1927 – 2009; 2013	Michigan State University	East Lansing, Michigan	Active	(Note: Chapter was formed by absorbing the Columbia Literary Society, established in 1892. It was re-established as a colony in 2011.)
Vermont Alpha-Sigma-Pi	February 19, 1927 – 1959	Norwich University	Northfield, Vermont	Inactive	(Note: Chapter was formed by absorbing Alpha Sigma Pi, established in 1857.)
**Rhode Island Alpha(A)**	February 23, 1929 – 20xx ?; 2013	University of Rhode Island	Kingston, Rhode Island	Active	(Note: Chapter was formed by absorbing Zeta Pi Alpha, established in 1920. It was re-established as a colony in 2011.)
Vermont Beta	March 2, 1929 – 1999	University of Vermont	Burlington, Vermont	Inactive	(Note: Chapter was formed by absorbing Sigma Alpha Chi, established in 1922.)
**California Delta**	March 9, 1929 – 1993; 2000	University of California, Los Angeles	Los Angeles, California	Active	(Note: Chapter was formed by absorbing Chi Alpha, established in 1927. It was re-established as a colony in 1998.)
**Oklahoma Mu**	February 14, 1931	Oklahoma State University–Stillwater	Stillwater, Oklahoma	Active	(Note: Chapter was formed by absorbing Chi Beta, established in 1921.)
North Carolina Nu	February 20, 1931 – 2002; 2012–2019	Duke University	Durham, North Carolina	Inactive	(Note: Chapter was formed by absorbing Psi Delta Sigma, established in 1927.)
**California Epsilon**	March 7, 1931	Occidental College	Los Angeles, California	Active	(Note: Chapter was formed by absorbing Delta Beta Tau, established in 1926.)
Maryland Rho-Delta	March 10, 1935 – 1942	St. John's College	Annapolis, Maryland	Inactive	(Note: Chapter was formed by absorbing Theta Psi, established in 1927.)
**North Dakota Beta**	April 6, 1935	North Dakota State University	Fargo, North Dakota	Active	(Note: Chapter was formed by absorbing Alpha Sigma Tau, established in 1924.)
Massachusetts Kappa	October 30, 1937 – 1964; 1970–1982	University of Massachusetts Amherst	Amherst, Massachusetts	Inactive	(Note: Chapter was formed by absorbing Kappa Epsilon, established in 1913.)
Utah Upsilon	October 29, 1939 – 1989	Utah State University	Logan, Utah	Inactive	(Note: Chapter was formed by absorbing Phi Kappa Iota, established in 1907.)
**New Mexico Phi**	February 23, 1941	New Mexico State University	Las Cruces, New Mexico	Active	(Note: Chapter was formed by absorbing Phi Chi Psi, established in 1926.)
**Connecticut Beta**	October 9, 1943 – 1971; 1984–2014; 2022	University of Connecticut	Storrs, Connecticut	Active	(Note: Chapter was formed by absorbing Sigma Phi Gamma, established in 1914. It was re-established as a colony in 1983 and 2021.)
**Maryland Beta**	October 24, 1943 – 2004; 2010	University of Maryland, College Park	College Park, Maryland	Active	(Note: Chapter was formed by absorbing Pi Kappa, established in 1940. It was re-established as a colony in 2009.)
**Ohio Kappa**	May 26, 1945 – 2002; 2007	Bowling Green State University	Bowling Green, Ohio	Active	(Note: Chapter was formed by absorbing the local group, Five Brothers, established in 1922. It was re-established as a colony in 2004.)
**New Mexico Tau**	February 9, 1946 – 2013; 2024	University of New Mexico	Albuquerque, New Mexico	Active	(Note: Chapter was formed by absorbing Phi Alpha, established in 1946.) (Note: Chapter suspended 2013.)
Florida Alpha(A)	February 22, 1946 – 2013	University of Miami	Coral Gables, Florida	Inactive	(Note: Chapter was formed by absorbing the Minerva Club, established in 1945. It was re-established as a colony in 2002.)
North Carolina Alpha(A)	October 25, 1947 – 2004; 2008–2016	North Carolina State University	Raleigh, North Carolina	Inactive	(Note: Chapter was formed by absorbing Phi Alpha, established in 1946. It was re-established as a colony in 2006.)
**California Zeta**	November 1, 1947 – 1973; 19xx ?–200x ?; 2008	San Jose State University	San Jose, California	Active	(Note: Chapter was formed by absorbing Gamma Phi Sigma, established in 1938. It was re-established as a colony in 2005.)
Texas Gamma	November 9, 1947 – 2000	University of Texas at El Paso	El Paso, Texas	Inactive	(Note: Chapter was formed by absorbing Nu Kappa Sigma, established in 1927.)
**Indiana Delta**	February 25, 1949 – 2016, 2019	DePauw University	Greencastle, Indiana	Active	(Note: Chapter was formed by absorbing Phi Alpha, established in 1947.)
**Florida Beta**	March 5, 1949 – 2000; 2008	Florida State University	Tallahassee, Florida	Active	
**Oregon Gamma**	March 19, 1949	Willamette University	Salem, Oregon	Active	
Utah Phi	March 26, 1949 – 1977; 1979–1996	University of Utah	Salt Lake City, Utah	Inactive	(Note: Chapter was formed by absorbing Phi Kappa Iota, established in 1947. It was re-established as a colony in 1977.)
**California Eta Emerging Chapter**	April 2, 1949 – 200x ?; 2005–2013; 2023	University of California, Santa Barbara	Santa Barbara County, California	Active	(Note: Chapter was formed by absorbing Gamma Sigma Pi, established in 1940.)
**Missouri Gamma**	April 23, 1949 – 1991; 1995	Westminster College	Fulton, Missouri	Active	(Note: Chapter was formed by absorbing Gamma Sigma, established in 1947.)
**California Theta**	October 8, 1949	San Diego State University	San Diego, California	Active	(Note: Chapter was formed by absorbing Epsilon Eta, established in 1921. It was re-established as a colony in 1994.)
**California Iota**	October 15, 1949	California State University, Fresno	Fresno, California	Active	(Note: Chapter was formed by absorbing Zeta Mu, established in 1923.)
**Florida Gamma**	November 12, 1949	Florida Southern College	Lakeland, Florida	Active	(Note: Chapter was formed by absorbing Rho Epsilon Chi, established in 1948.)
**Washington Gamma**	November 3, 1953 – 2000; 2010	University of Puget Sound	Tacoma, Washington	Active	(Note: Chapter was formed by absorbing Pau Tau Omega, established in 1948. It was re-established as a colony in 2010.)
**New York Epsilon**	December 8, 1951	Rensselaer Polytechnic Institute	Troy, New York	Active	(Note: Chapter was formed by absorbing Lambda Alpha Epsilon, established in 1949.)
California Kappa	February 16, 1952 – 1989; 1999–2012	University of California, Davis	Davis, California	Inactive	(Note: Chapter was formed by absorbing Phi Alpha Iota, established in 1913. It was re-established as a colony in 1997.)
**Ohio Nu**	March 23, 1953	University of Toledo	Toledo, Ohio	Active	(Note: Chapter was formed by absorbing Alpha Phi Omega, established in 1921.)
Ohio Gamma	April 17, 1953 – 2014	Ohio University	Athens, Ohio	Inactive	(Note: Chapter was formed by absorbing Gamma Gamma Gamma, established in 1923.)
**Texas Alpha(A)**	October 3, 1953	Texas Tech University	Lubbock, Texas	Active	(Note: Chapter was formed by absorbing the local group, Adelphean, established in 1940.)
Tennessee Sigma (Σ)	November 14, 1953 – 2018	University of Memphis	Memphis, Tennessee	Inactive	(Note: Chapter was formed by absorbing Phi Alpha, established in 1950.)
**West Virginia Alpha(A)**	November 21, 1953 – 1982; 1998	Marshall University	Huntington, West Virginia	Active	(Note: Chapter was formed by absorbing Phi Tau Alpha, established in 1925. It was re-established as a colony in 1998.)
**Ohio Lambda**	December 5, 1953 – 2002; 200x ?–2010; 2015	Kent State University	Kent, Ohio	Active	(Note: Chapter was formed by absorbing Sigma Delta, established in 1950. It was re-established as a colony in 2004 and 2012.)
**California Lambda**	November 5, 1955 – 2016; 2020	California State University, Long Beach	Long Beach, California	Active	(Note: Chapter was formed by absorbing Sigma Epsilon Chi, established in 1950. It was re-established as a colony in 2019.)
**Texas Beta**	December 10, 1955 – 1982; 1987	Texas Christian University	Fort Worth, Texas	Active	(Note: Chapter was formed by absorbing Phi Alpha, established in 1954. It was re-established as a colony in 1985.)
**Texas Epsilon**	February 4, 1956 – 1991; 2014	University of Houston	Houston, Texas	Active	(Note: Chapter was formed by absorbing Kappa Delta Kappa, established in 1945. It was re-established as a colony in 2014.)
**Indiana Epsilon**	December 14, 1957	University of Evansville	Evansville, Indiana	Active	(Note: Chapter was formed by absorbing Pi Epsilon Phi, established in 1854.)
Wisconsin Beta	February 15, 1958 – 1980	Ripon College	Ripon, Wisconsin	Inactive	(Note: Chapter was formed by absorbing Delta Sigma Psi, established in 1921.)
**Ohio Alpha(A)**	December 5, 1959	Youngstown State University	Youngstown, Ohio	Active	(Note: Chapter was formed by absorbing Phi Gamma, established in 1927.)
**Michigan Delta**	October 7, 1961 – 2011; March 21, 2026	Western Michigan University	Kalamazoo, Michigan	Active	(Note: Chapter was formed by absorbing Phi Alpha, established in 1960.)
**Arizona Beta** colony	December 9, 1961 – 199x ?; 2003–2013; 2018-2026	Arizona State University	Tempe, Arizona	Inactive	(Note: Chapter was formed by absorbing Phi Alpha, established in 1958. It was re-established as a colony in 2002 and 2018.)
**Tennessee Alpha (A)**	October 26, 1963 – 1983; 2003-2026	East Tennessee State University	Johnson City, Tennessee	Inactive	
Illinois Alpha(A)	November 16, 1963 – 1980	Monmouth College	Monmouth, Illinois	Inactive	(Note: Chapter was formed by absorbing Phi Alpha Sigma, established in 1961.)
**New Mexico Alpha(A)**	December 14, 1963 – 20xx ?; 2021	Eastern New Mexico University	Portales, New Mexico	Active	(Note: Chapter was formed by absorbing Phi Alpha, established in 1962. Re-established as an emerging chapter in August 2021)
**Kentucky Beta**	October 2, 1965	Western Kentucky University	Bowling Green, Kentucky	Active	(Note: Chapter was formed by absorbing Delta Kappa Nu, established in 1960.)
Arkansas Beta	1965–1980	University of Arkansas at Little Rock	Little Rock, Arkansas	Inactive	(Note: Chapter was formed by absorbing Phi Alpha Beta, established in 1958.)
**California Mu**	October 23, 1965	California State University, Los Angeles	Los Angeles, California	Active	(Note: Chapter was formed by absorbing Beta Chi, established in 1959.)
Oregon Delta	October 30, 1965 – 1994	Lewis & Clark College	Portland, Oregon	Inactive	(Note: Chapter was formed by absorbing Alpha Rho Omega, established in 1925.)
**Michigan Epsilon A** **Michigan Epsilon B**	November 6, 1965	Kettering University	Flint, Michigan	Active	(Note: Chapter was formed by absorbing Phi Tau Alpha, established in 1928. This school utilizes a vocational structure, where half of the students attend classes while the other half are deployed to industry partners in a co-op model, akin to internships. Students must complete five such co-op periods to graduate; thus the chapter is split into an "A" section and "B" section.)
**Iowa Chi**	November 13, 1965	University of Northern Iowa	Cedar Falls, Iowa	Active	(Note: Chapter was formed by absorbing Alpha Chi Epsilon, established in 1915.)
**Mississippi Sigma**	December 11, 1965	University of Southern Mississippi	Hattiesburg, Mississippi	Active	(Note: Chapter was formed by absorbing Phi Alpha, established in 1963.)
**Illinois Gamma**	January 29, 1966 – 1988; 1998	Northern Illinois University	DeKalb, Illinois	Active	(Note: Chapter was formed by absorbing Delta Phi Beta, established in 1961. It was re-established as a colony in 1994.)
**Illinois Epsilon**	September 30, 1967	Bradley University	Peoria, Illinois	Active	(Note: Chapter was formed by absorbing Phi Alpha, established in 1966.)
**Kansas Gamma**	October 7, 1967	Wichita State University	Wichita, Kansas	Active	(Note: Chapter was formed by absorbing Phi Alpha, established in 1965.)
**Indiana Zeta**	October 28, 1967	Ball State University	Muncie, Indiana	Active	(Note: Chapter was formed by absorbing Beta Gamma Nu, established in 1965.)
**Virginia Alpha**	November 11, 1967	Randolph–Macon College	Ashland, Virginia	Active	(Note: Chapter was formed by absorbing Phi Alpha, established in 1964.)
Minnesota Beta	November 18, 1967 – 1975	Minnesota State University, Mankato	Mankato, Minnesota	Inactive	(Note: Chapter was formed by absorbing Phi Beta, established in 1964.)
California Nu	December 9, 1967 – 2002; 2009 - 2025	California State University, Northridge	Los Angeles, California	Inactive	(Note: Chapter was formed by absorbing Pi Kappa Tau, established in 1961. It was re-established as a colony in 2008.)
**California Xi**	December 16, 1967 – 1999; 2016	California State University, Sacramento	Sacramento, California	Active	
**Louisiana Alpha(A)**	January 13, 1968	University of Louisiana at Lafayette	Lafayette, Louisiana	Active	
**Florida Delta**	January 20, 1968 – 2012; 2019	University of South Florida	Tampa, Florida	Active	(Note: Chapter was formed by absorbing the local group, Enotas, established in 1961. It was re-established as a colony in 2016.)
**Nebraska Iota**	February 17, 1968	Creighton University	Omaha, Nebraska	Active	(Note: Chapter was formed by absorbing Iota Kappa Epsilon, established in 1958.)
California Sigma	September 20, 1969 – 20xx ?	University of San Francisco	San Francisco, California	Inactive	
**California Pi**	September 27, 1969 – 1990; 2023	California State University, Fullerton	Fullerton, California	Active	(Note: Chapter was formed by absorbing Sigma Chi Epsilon, established in 1966.)
**Connecticut Lambda**	October 18, 1969 – 1974; 2000 - ??	University of Hartford	West Hartford, Connecticut	Active	(Note: Chapter was formed by absorbing Lambda Phi Alpha, established in 1954.) (Note: The University of Hartford suspended the Connecticut Lambda chapter from 2021 to 2022.)
**Indiana Sigma**	October 25, 1969	Indiana State University	Terre Haute, Indiana	Active	(Note: Chapter was formed by absorbing Phi Rho Iota, established in 1967.)
West Virginia Beta	November 1, 1969 – 1983	Bethany College	Bethany, West Virginia	Inactive	(Note: Chapter was formed by absorbing Phi Alpha, established in 1967.)
Tennessee Delta (Δ) - colony	November 22, 1969 – 2019	Tennessee Technological University	Cookeville, Tennessee	Inactive	(Note: Chapter was formed by absorbing Sigma Phi Delta, established in 1962.) (Note: Chapter suspended in 2019.)
**New York Beta**	November 29, 1969 – 1977, 2017	LIU Post	Brookville, New York	Active	(Note: Chapter was formed by absorbing Sigma Beta Epsilon, established in 1955. It was re-established as a colony in 2015.)
New York Sigma	November 29, 1969 – 1974	Adelphi University	Garden City, New York	Inactive	(Note: Chapter was formed by absorbing Chi Sigma, established in 1947.)
**Tennessee Beta (B)**	December 13, 1969 – 2013; 2019	Middle Tennessee State University	Murfreesboro, Tennessee	Active	(Note: Chapter was formed by absorbing Lambda Psi, established in 1966. It was re-established as a colony in 2017.)
Colorado Alpha(A)	January 10, 1970 – 201x ?	University of Northern Colorado	Greeley, Colorado	Inactive	(Note: Chapter was formed by absorbing Phi Alpha, established in 1969.)
California Rho	January 17, 1970 – 1998	University of the Pacific	Stockton, California	Inactive	(Note: Chapter was formed by absorbing Theta Tau, established in 1968.)
**South Carolina Nu**	April 11, 1970 – 1998; 2003–2015; 2026	Clemson University	Clemson, South Carolina	Active	(Note: Chapter was formed by absorbing the local Numeral Society, established in 1956. It was re-established as a colony in 2002. Lost its charter in 2021 and returned 2026.)
**South Dakota Theta**	February 27, 1971	South Dakota State University	Brookings, South Dakota	Active	(Note: Chapter was formed by absorbing Phi Alpha, established in 1968.)
**Alabama Chi**	May 8, 1971 – 2003; 2020	University of South Alabama	Mobile, Alabama	Active	(Note: Chapter was formed by absorbing Phi Alpha Chi, established by 1967.)
Pennsylvania Epsilon	September 18, 1971 – 1998; 2008–2010	Drexel University	Philadelphia, Pennsylvania	Inactive	(Note: Chapter was formed by absorbing Sigma Alpha Theta, established in 1966. It was re-established as a colony in 2007.)
**Kentucky Gamma**	October 23, 1971	Morehead State University	Morehead, Kentucky	Active	(Note: Chapter was formed by absorbing Sigma Gamma Gamma, established in 1933.)
New Mexico Sigma	November 6, 1971 – 1975	New Mexico Highlands University	Las Vegas, New Mexico	Inactive	(Note: Chapter was formed by absorbing Sigma Phi Alpha.)
**Missouri Delta**	April 18, 1972 – 2001; 2006	Rockhurst University	Kansas City, Missouri	Active	(Note: Chapter was formed by absorbing Phi Alpha Epsilon, established in 1968.)
**Tennessee Tau (T)**	September 30, 1972	University of Tennessee at Martin	Martin, Tennessee	Active	(Note: Chapter was formed by absorbing Phi Alpha, established in 1970.)
Utah Sigma	November 4, 1972 – 1978; 1989–2011	Weber State University	Ogden, Utah	Inactive	(Note: Chapter was formed by absorbing Sigma Delta Phi, established in 1938. It was re-established in 1989 by absorbing Delta Theta Xi.)
**Florida Sigma**	January 27, 1973	University of West Florida	Pensacola, Florida	Active	
**Florida Epsilon**	February 3, 1973 – 2006; 2018	University of Central Florida	Orlando, Florida	Active	
**Michigan Zeta**	September 15, 1973	Ferris State University	Big Rapids, Michigan	Active	(Note: Chapter was formed by absorbing Sigma Tau Beta, established in 1967.)
**Georgia Sigma**	October 13, 1973	Valdosta State University	Valdosta, Georgia	Active	(Note: Chapter was formed by absorbing Phi Alpha, established in 1971.)
**Kentucky Delta**	October 27, 1973	Eastern Kentucky University	Richmond, Kentucky	Active	(Note: Chapter was formed by absorbing Beta Omicron Gamma, established in 1969.)
Arizona Gamma	September 27, 1975 – 2001	Northern Arizona University	Flagstaff, Arizona	Inactive	(Note: Chapter was formed by absorbing Phi Alpha, established in 1973.)
Oklahoma Tau	October 18, 1975 – 1986	Oklahoma City University	Oklahoma City, Oklahoma	Inactive	
Virginia Zeta	October 25, 1975 – 2016	Virginia Tech	Blacksburg, Virginia	Inactive	(Note: Chapter was formed by absorbing Delta Pi Zeta, established by 1960.) (Note: Chapter suspended in 2016.)
**Maryland Sigma**	November 12, 1977 – 2012; 200x ?	Salisbury University	Salisbury, Maryland	Active	(Note: Chapter was formed by absorbing Phi Alpha, established in 1975. It was re-established as a colony in 2015.)
**Alabama Epsilon**	May 24, 1980 – 2010; 2022	Troy University	Troy, Alabama	Active	(Note: Chapter was suspended in 2010. Re-established as an emerging chapter in August 2022.)
**Texas Tau**	April 11, 1981	Texas A&M University	College Station, Texas	Active	
**Maryland Alpha(A)**	September 17, 1981	Towson University	Towson, Maryland	Active	
**North Carolina Delta**	September 26, 1981	University of North Carolina Wilmington	Wilmington, North Carolina	Active	(Note: Chapter was formed by absorbing De Kappa Tate, established in 1977.)
Indiana Theta	July 17, 1982 – 1984	University of Southern Indiana	Evansville, Indiana	Inactive	
Florida Chi	October 23, 1982 – 1991	University of Tampa	Tampa, Florida	Inactive	(Note: Chapter was formed by absorbing Sigma Alpha Chi, established in 1980.)
Louisiana Rho	April 16, 1983 – xxxx ?	Louisiana Tech University	Ruston, Louisiana	Inactive	
Illinois Alpha-Omega	August 8, 1983 – 1998; 2002–2017	Loyola University Chicago	Chicago, Illinois	Inactive	
New Jersey Alpha(A)	November 5, 1983 – 2014	Princeton University	Princeton, New Jersey	Inactive	
California Tau	March 31, 1984 – 2008	California Polytechnic State University, San Luis Obispo	San Luis Obispo, California	Inactive	(Note: Chapter was formed by absorbing Alpha Tau Omicron, established in 1982.)
Michigan Delta-Tau	April 7, 1984 – 2014	Alma College	Alma, Michigan	Inactive	(Note: Chapter was formed by absorbing Delta Gamma Tau, established in 1938.)
**California Upsilon**	January 19, 1985	University of La Verne	La Verne, California	Active	(Note: Chapter was formed by absorbing Eta Omega Delta, established in 1982.)
**Nevada Beta**	October 12, 1981	University of Nevada, Las Vegas	Paradise, Nevada	Active	
New York Omega	November 1, 1986 – 2021	Binghamton University	Binghamton, New York	Inactive	
California Phi	November 22, 1986 – 2000	Santa Clara University	Santa Clara, California	Inactive	(Note: The University of Santa Clara suspended California Phi for two years in the spring of 2000. In March 2001, the university announced that it was phasing out Greek letter organizations over the next two years.)
**South Carolina Sigma**	February 14, 1987 – 2004; 2016	Winthrop University	Rock Hill, South Carolina	Active	
Maryland Omicron-Pi	October 10, 1987 – 2016	University of Maryland, Baltimore County	Baltimore County, Maryland	Inactive	(Note: Chapter was formed by absorbing Sigma Alpha, established in 1984.)
**California Chi**	October 24, 1987 – 200x ?; 2012	University of California, San Diego	San Diego, California	Active	
**California Psi**	November 27, 1987	University of California, Irvine	Irvine, California	Active	
Texas Kappa	March 5, 1988 – 2003	University of North Texas	Denton, Texas	Inactive	
Connecticut Omega	1999–2018	Yale University	New Haven, Connecticut	Inactive	(Note: Chapter left SAE and became LEO.)
**Alabama Nu colony**	February 11, 1989 – 2014; 2018	University of North Alabama	Florence, Alabama	Active	
California Omega	October 7, 1989 – 1993	University of California, Santa Cruz	Santa Cruz, California	Inactive	(Note: Chapter was formed by absorbing Alpha Beta, established in 1987.)
**Tennessee Rho (P)**	November 11, 1989	Christian Brothers University	Memphis, Tennessee	Active	
Illinois Tau-Alpha	April 7, 1990 – 2006; 2015–2016	Illinois State University	Normal, Illinois	Inactive	
**California Omicron**	April 21, 1990 – 2001; 2013	University of California, Riverside	Riverside, California	Active	
California Alpha-Alpha(A-A)	April 8, 1990 – 2014	Sonoma State University	Rohnert Park, California	Inactive	
**Mississippi Delta**	May 31, 1990	Millsaps College	Jackson, Mississippi	Active	
New York Pi	November 10, 1990 – 2018	University at Albany, SUNY	Albany, New York	Inactive	
**Georgia Alpha(A)**	May 18, 1991	Georgia Southern University	Statesboro, Georgia	Active	
**Maryland Delta**	October 12, 1991	Frostburg State University	Frostburg, Maryland	Active	
Ontario Alpha(A)	October 17, 1992 – 2003	University of Western Ontario	London, Ontario	Inactive	
**California Alpha-Beta**	February 27, 1993	California State Polytechnic University, Pomona	Pomona, California	Active	(Note: Chapter was formed by absorbing Iota Gamma Nu, established in 1990.)
**Virginia Mu (M)**	October 23, 1993 – 2002; 2026	James Madison University	Harrisonburg, Virginia	Active	
Pennsylvania Eta-Gamma	April 16, 1994 – 2016	Villanova University	Villanova, Pennsylvania	Inactive	
**Texas Sigma**	October 1, 1994 – 2003; 2012	Texas State University	San Marcos, Texas	Active	
**New York Phi**	April 8, 1995 – 2002; 2022	University at Buffalo	Buffalo, New York	Active	(Note: Chapter was formed by absorbing Alpha Sigma, established in 1992. It was re-established as a colony in 2018.)
**Pennsylvania Sigma-Mu**	November 18, 1995	Albright College	Reading, Pennsylvania	Active	
**Florida Rho**	December 15, 1995	Embry–Riddle Aeronautical University	Daytona Beach, Florida	Active	
**Pennsylvania Xi**	October 19, 1996	Duquesne University	Pittsburgh, Pennsylvania	Active	(Note: Chapter was formed by absorbing Zeta Beta Tau, established in 1969.)
North Carolina Sigma	October 19, 1996 – 2018	East Carolina University	Greenville, North Carolina	Inactive	
**Ohio Phi**	March 8, 1997	University of Akron	Akron, Ohio	Active	
**Delaware Alpha(A)**	April 19, 1997	University of Delaware	Newark, Delaware	Active	
Maryland Phi	October 18, 1997 - 2015	Johns Hopkins University	Baltimore, Maryland	Inactive	
**Illinois Delta-Pi**	November 8, 1997	DePaul University	Chicago, Illinois	Active	
Michigan Sigma-Sigma	March 28, 1998 – 2018	Oakland University	Oakland County, Michigan	Inactive	(Note: Chapter was formed by absorbing Sigma Alpha Sigma, established in 1982.)
California Alpha-Delta	November 14, 1998 – 2014, 2019 – May 18, 2022	Chapman University	Orange, California	Inactive	(Note: Chapter was formed by absorbing Alpha Chi.) (Note: The university suspended the chapter from 2014 to 2019. It returned but was permanently eliminated by the university for hazing in May 2022.)
**Kentucky Sigma**	March 17, 1999	University of Louisville	Louisville, Kentucky	Active	
**California Alpha-Gamma**	April 17, 1999	California State University San Marcos	San Marcos, California	Active	(Note: Chapter was formed by absorbing Sigma Phi Delta, established 1992.)
**New York Zeta**	April 24, 1999	State University of New York at Oswego	Oswego, New York	Active	(Note: Chapter was formed by absorbing Zeta Beta Tau, established in 1992.)
**South Carolina Beta**	March 25, 2000	University of South Carolina Upstate	Valley Falls, South Carolina	Active	
**Arizona Delta**	April 15, 2000	Embry–Riddle Aeronautical University	Prescott, Arizona	Active	
**Alaska Alpha(A)**	September 23, 2000	University of Alaska Anchorage	Anchorage, Alaska	Active	
**Kansas Delta**	November 4, 2000	Fort Hays State University	Hays, Kansas	Active	
**North Carolina Epsilon**	February 24, 2001 – 2002; 2010	Appalachian State University	Boone, North Carolina	Active	
**New York Chi**	May 1, 2001	Hofstra University	Nassau County, New York	Active	
**Massachusetts Epsilon**	April 13, 2002	Emerson College	Boston, Massachusetts	Active	(Note: Chapter was formed by absorbing Phi Alpha, established in 1986.)
**Texas Chi**	February 22, 2003	University of Texas at Dallas	Richardson, Texas	Active	
Missouri Zeta	November 22, 2003 – 2019	Saint Louis University	St. Louis, Missouri	Active	
**Pennsylvania Tau-Gamma**	April 3, 2004	West Chester University	West Chester, Pennsylvania	Active	
**Michigan Delta-Omega**	April 24, 2004	Central Michigan University	Mount Pleasant, Michigan	Active	
Ohio Beta	May 1, 2004 – 2005	John Carroll University	University Heights, Ohio	Inactive	(Note: Chapter was formed by absorbing Phi Beta Phi.)
**North Carolina Omega**	January 29, 2005	Western Carolina University	Cullowhee, North Carolina	Active	
**Florida Nu**	February 12, 2005	University of North Florida	Jacksonville, Florida	Active	
**Louisiana Chi**	March 5, 2005	Nicholls State University	Thibodaux, Louisiana	Active	
**North Carolina Chi**	March 19, 2005	Wake Forest University	Winston-Salem, North Carolina	Active	
New York Tau-Gamma	April 30, 2005 – 2009	Rochester Institute of Technology	Rochester, New York	Inactive	(Note: Chapter was formed by absorbing the local group, True Gentlemen Club, established in 2001.)
**New Jersey Tau-Gamma**	March 8, 2006	College of New Jersey	Ewing, New Jersey	Active	
**Pennsylvania Beta-Phi**	April 1, 2006	Mansfield University of Pennsylvania	Mansfield, Pennsylvania	Active	
Idaho Beta	April 29, 2006 – 2012	Boise State University	Boise, Idaho	Inactive	
**Missouri Kappa-Chi**	November 4, 2006	University of Missouri–Kansas City	Kansas City, Missouri	Active	
**Florida Alpha-Mu**	January 13, 2007	Saint Leo University	St. Leo, Florida	Active	
Virginia Chi	February 24, 2007 – 2016	Virginia Commonwealth University	Richmond, Virginia	Inactive	
**West Virginia Gamma**	April 21, 2007	West Virginia University	Morgantown, West Virginia	Active	
**Massachusetts Beta-Alpha**	April 28, 2007	Boston Consortium	Boston, Massachusetts	Active	(Note: The Boston Consortium includes all Boston area schools without an established SAE chapter, including Boston University, Boston College, Emmanuel College, MCPHS University, Northeastern University, and Wentworth Institute of Technology.)
**Texas Zeta**	October 1, 2007	University of Texas at Tyler	Tyler, Texas	Active	
South Carolina Alpha(A)	November 3, 2007 – 2013	Coastal Carolina University	Conway, South Carolina	Inactive	
**Indiana Iota-Pi**	November 1, 2008	Indiana University Indianapolis	Indianapolis, Indiana	Active	
**Wisconsin Lambda-Chi**	February 21, 2009	University of Wisconsin–La Crosse	La Crosse, Wisconsin	Active	
**Georgia Omega**	March 28, 2009	Kennesaw State University	Cobb County, Georgia	Active	
**Illinois Sigma-Sigma**	May 2, 2009	Western Illinois University	Macomb, Illinois	Active	
**Illinois Delta Lambda**	May 16, 2009	Eastern Illinois University	Charleston, Illinois	Active	
California Chi-Mu	October 3, 2009 – 2015	University of California, Merced	Merced, California	Inactive	
Minnesota Gamma	November 21, 2009 - 2022	Gustavus Adolphus College	St. Peter, Minnesota	Inactive	
**Virginia Delta**	February 20, 2010	George Mason University	Fairfax, Virginia	Active	
**Pennsylvania Kappa**	November 20, 2010	Kutztown University of Pennsylvania	Kutztown, Pennsylvania	Active	
**Texas Omega**	January 29, 2011	Midwestern State University	Wichita Falls, Texas	Active	
**Connecticut Nu-Eta**	April 16, 2011	University of New Haven	West Haven, Connecticut	Active	
**Texas Phi**	May 12, 2011	Stephen F. Austin State University	Nacogdoches, Texas	Active	
**North Carolina Beta**	October 22, 2011	University of North Carolina at Charlotte	Charlotte, North Carolina	Active	
**Massachusetts Sigma**	May 6, 2012	Suffolk University	Boston Massachusetts	Active	
**Mississippi Delta-Sigma**	November 11, 2012	Delta State University	Cleveland, Mississippi	Active	
**New Jersey Rho**	November 17, 2012	Rutgers University-New Brunswick	New Brunswick, New Jersey	Active	
**Florida Omicron**	March 23, 2013	Rollins College	Winter Park, Florida	Active	
**Washington City Eta-Sigma**	April 28, 2013	Georgetown University	Washington, D.C.	Active	
Georgia Mu	August 17, 2013 – 2022	Georgia College & State University	Milledgeville, Georgia	Inactive	(Note: Chapter dissolved by the college in February 2022 for hazing.)
**Colorado Phi**	December 13, 2014	University of Colorado Colorado Springs	Colorado Springs, Colorado	Active	
**New Jersey Rho-Sigma**	March 7, 2015	Stockton University	Galloway Township, New Jersey	Active	
**Wisconsin Sigma**	November 14, 2015	University of Wisconsin–Stout	Menomonie, Wisconsin	Active	
**Maryland Mu**	February 20, 2016	McDaniel College	Westminster, Maryland	Active	
**New Jersey Iota Tau**	March 5, 2016	New Jersey Institute of Technology	Newark, New Jersey	Active	
**Ohio Chi-Sigma**	March 12, 2016	University of Dayton	Dayton, Ohio	Active	(Note: Chapter was established by absorbing the local Chi Sigma Alpha fraternity originally founded in 1962. The Chi Sig fraternity was formed by the members of the Flyer's Hangar; a group established in the late-1940s by student pilots who had returned from World War II.)
**New Jersey Omega**	April 2, 2016	Rowan University	Glassboro, New Jersey	Active	
**Georgia Rho (P)**	April 2, 2016 – 2021	Georgia Southern University–Armstrong Campus	Savannah, Georgia	Inactive	
**Quebec Alpha(A)**	April 17, 2016	McGill University	Montreal, Quebec	Active	
**Florida Lambda**	November 5, 2016	Lynn University	Boca Raton, Florida	Active	
**Massachusetts Tau Gamma**	November 18, 2017	Salem State University	Salem, Massachusetts	Active	
**Washington City Alpha(A)**	April 7, 2017	American University	Washington, D.C.	Active	
**Pennsylvania Psi-Eta**	September 16, 2017	Penn State Harrisburg	Lower Swatara Township, Pennsylvania	Active	
**Texas Nu**	March 3, 2018	University of Texas at San Antonio	San Antonio, Texas	Active	
**California Eta**	February 3, 2023	University of California - Santa Barbara	Santa Barbara, California	Active	
