= 1995 Senior PGA Tour =

Golf tour season

1995 Senior PGA Tour season
- Duration: January 13, 1995 – November 12, 1995
- Number of official events: 39
- Most wins: (United States) Jim Colbert (4) (United States) Bob Murphy (4)
- Money list: (United States) Jim Colbert
- Player of the Year: (United States) Jim Colbert
- Rookie of the Year: (United States) Hale Irwin

The 1995 Senior PGA Tour was the 16th season of the Senior PGA Tour, the main professional golf tour in the United States for men aged 50 and over.

== Schedule ==
The following table lists official events during the 1995 season.

Date	Tournament	Location	Purse (US$)	Winner (Note: The number in parentheses after each winner's name is the number of Senior PGA Tour events they had won up to and including that tournament. This information is only shown for Senior PGA Tour members.)	Notes
Jan 15	Senior Tournament of Champions	Puerto Rico	750,000	(United States) Jim Colbert (10)	
Feb 5	Royal Caribbean Classic	Florida	850,000	(United States) J. C. Snead (2)	
Feb 12	IntelliNet Challenge	Florida	600,000	(United States) Bob Murphy (5)	
Feb 19	GTE Suncoast Classic	Florida	750,000	(United States) Dave Stockton (10)	
Mar 5	FHP Health Care Classic	California	750,000	(Australia) Bruce Devlin (1)	
Mar 12	The Dominion Seniors	Texas	650,000	(United States) Jim Albus (5)	
Mar 19	Toshiba Senior Classic	California	800,000	(United States) George Archer (16)	New tournament
Apr 2	The Tradition	Arizona	1,000,000	(United States) Jack Nicklaus (8)	Senior PGA Tour major championship
Apr 16	PGA Seniors' Championship	Florida	1,000,000	(United States) Raymond Floyd (10)	Senior major championship
Apr 30	Las Vegas Senior Classic	Nevada	1,000,000	(United States) Jim Colbert (11)	
May 7	PaineWebber Invitational	North Carolina	800,000	(United States) Bob Murphy (6)	
May 14	Cadillac NFL Golf Classic	New Jersey	950,000	(United States) George Archer (17)	
May 21	Bell Atlantic Classic	Pennsylvania	900,000	(United States) Jim Colbert (12)	
May 28	Quicksilver Classic	Pennsylvania	1,100,000	(United States) Dave Stockton (11)	
Jun 4	Bruno's Memorial Classic	Alabama	1,050,000	(Australia) Graham Marsh (1)	
Jun 11	BellSouth Senior Classic	Tennessee	1,100,000	(United States) Jim Dent (9)	
Jun 18	Dallas Reunion Pro-Am	Texas	550,000	(United States) Tom Wargo (4)	Pro-Am
Jun 25	Nationwide Championship	Georgia	1,200,000	(United States) Bob Murphy (7)	
Jul 2	U.S. Senior Open	Maryland	1,000,000	(United States) Tom Weiskopf (2)	Senior major championship
Jul 9	Kroger Senior Classic	Ohio	900,000	(United States) Mike Hill (17)	
Jul 16	Ford Senior Players Championship	Michigan	1,500,000	(United States) J. C. Snead (3)	Senior PGA Tour major championship
Jul 23	First of America Classic	Michigan	700,000	(United States) Jimmy Powell (3)	
Jul 30	Senior British Open	Northern Ireland	£350,000	(Scotland) Brian Barnes (1)	Senior major championship (Note: Unofficial money event at the time, but retrospectively counted as an official win.)
Jul 30	Ameritech Senior Open	Illinois	850,000	(United States) Hale Irwin (1)	
Aug 6	VFW Senior Championship	Missouri	900,000	(United States) Bob Murphy (8)	
Aug 13	Burnet Senior Classic	Minnesota	1,100,000	(United States) Raymond Floyd (11)	
Aug 20	Northville Long Island Classic	New York	800,000	(United States) Lee Trevino (25)	
Aug 27	Bank of Boston Senior Classic	Massachusetts	800,000	(Japan) Isao Aoki (4)	
Sep 3	Franklin Quest Championship	Utah	600,000	(England) Tony Jacklin (2)	
Sep 10	GTE Northwest Classic	Washington	600,000	(United States) Walter Morgan (1)	
Sep 17	Brickyard Crossing Championship	Indiana	750,000	(South Africa) Simon Hobday (5)	
Sep 24	Bank One Classic	Kentucky	600,000	(South Africa) Gary Player (20)	
Oct 1	Vantage Championship	North Carolina	1,500,000	(United States) Hale Irwin (2)	
Oct 8	The Transamerica	California	650,000	(United States) Lee Trevino (26)	
Oct 15	Raley's Senior Gold Rush	California	700,000	(United States) Don Bies (7)	
Oct 22	Ralphs Senior Classic	California	800,000	(South Africa) John Bland (1)	
Oct 29	Hyatt Regency Maui Kaanapali Classic	Hawaii	600,000	(New Zealand) Bob Charles (24)	
Nov 5	Emerald Coast Classic	Florida	1,000,000	(United States) Raymond Floyd (12)	New tournament
Nov 12	Energizer Senior Tour Championship	South Carolina	1,500,000	(United States) Jim Colbert (13)	Tour Championship

=== Unofficial events ===
The following events were sanctioned by the Senior PGA Tour, but did not carry official money, nor were wins official.

Date	Tournament	Location	Purse ($)	Winners	Notes
Dec 3	Office Depot Father/Son Challenge	Florida	860,000	(United States) Raymond Floyd and son Raymond Floyd Jr.	Team event

== Money list ==
The money list was based on prize money won during the season, calculated in U.S. dollars.

Position	Player	Prize money ($)
1	(United States) Jim Colbert	1,444,386
2	(United States) Raymond Floyd	1,419,545
3	(United States) Dave Stockton	1,415,847
4	(United States) Bob Murphy	1,241,524
5	(Japan) Isao Aoki	1,041,766

== Awards ==
Award	Winner	Ref.
Player of the Year (Jack Nicklaus Trophy)	(United States) Jim Colbert	
Rookie of the Year	(United States) Hale Irwin	
Scoring leader (Byron Nelson Award)	(United States) Raymond Floyd	
Comeback Player of the Year	(United States) Walter Morgan	
