= Harry Bannerman =

Scottish professional golfer

Personal information
- Nationality: Scotland
- Born: 5 March 1942 (age 84) Aberdeen, Scotland

Career
- Sport: Golf
- Turned professional: 1965
- Former tours: European Tour; European Seniors Tour
- Professional wins: 11

Best results in major championships
- Masters Tournament: T33: 1972
- PGA Championship: DNP
- U.S. Open: DNP
- The Open Championship: T11: 1971

Harry Bannerman (born 5 March 1942) is a Scottish professional golfer best known for playing in the 1971 Ryder Cup.

Bannerman turned professional at the age of 23 and had a relatively short spell as a tournament professional before a back injury restricted his career. All his professional tournament wins came on the domestic Scottish circuit where he won the Scottish Professional Championship twice and the Northern Open three times. A consistent run of performances on the 1971 British PGA Circuit, with six top-10 finishes as well as 11th place in the Open Championship, left him in fourth place in the Ryder Cup points list and an automatic place in the Ryder Cup team. In his singles matches he halved his match against Arnold Palmer and beat Gardner Dickinson. He played on the European Tour from 1972 to 1977 and was twice a runner-up.

== Amateur career ==
In 1959 Bannerman represented Scotland in the England–Scotland boys match at Pollok Golf Club. In the Boys Amateur Championship the following week he reached the quarter-finals, before losing at the 21st hole.

In late 1965 Bannerman won the Scottish Alliance Championship, an open event. He turned professional soon afterwards, at the age of 23.

== Professional career ==
Bannerman became an assistant at Royal Aberdeen Golf Club. Later he was the tournament professional at Banchory and Murcar Links Golf Club and professional at Cruden Bay and at Schloss Mainsondheim in Germany. A back injury curtailed his playing career.

In 1967 Bannerman won both the Northern Open and the Scottish Professional Championship, a feat he repeated in 1972. He also won the Northern Open in 1969 and had a number of other successes in Scottish domestic tournaments. Bannerman was joint runner-up in the 1969 Algarve Open, behind Bernard Hunt.

Six members of the Great Britain team for the 1971 Ryder Cup were selected from a points list based on a player's best 10 performances in 15 events during the 1971 season, ending with the Benson & Hedges Festival of Golf on 21 August. From June to mid-August Bannerman had a number of high finishes including tied 6th in the Daks Tournament, tied 4th in the Gallaher Ulster Open, tied 11th in the Open Championship, tied 4th in the French Open, tied 9th in the Swiss Open, tied 7th in the Classic International and reaching the semi-finals of the Piccadilly Medal. He finished fourth in the points list to get a place in the team for St. Louis. The United States won the contest by 5 points. Bannerman had two wins, two defeats and a half. His half came against Arnold Palmer in the morning singles session. In the afternoon singles he beat Gardner Dickinson 2&1. Bannerman finished the season in 6th place in the Order of Merit.

Bannerman played on the European Tour from 1972 to 1977. He was twice runner-up on the tour, being second behind Jack Newton in the 1972 Benson & Hedges Festival of Golf and to Christy O'Connor Jnr in the 1975 Carroll's Irish Open. Bannerman had some success on the Safari Circuit in early 1975. He lost in a playoff for the Nigerian Open and was runner-up behind Ronnie Shade in the Mufulira Open.

Bannerman later played in a number of tournaments on the European Senior Tour from 1992 to 1998. His best finish was to be tied for third place in the 1992 Tunisian Seniors.

== Professional wins (11) ==
- 1965 Scottish Alliance Championship (as an amateur)
- 1967 Northern Open, Scottish Professional Championship
- 1969 Northern Open
- 1970 Cutty Sark Tournament
- 1971 Skol Tournament
- 1972 Northern Open, Scottish Coca-Cola Tournament, Scottish Professional Championship
- 1974 Scottish Uniroyal Tournament (tied with John McTear)
- 1976 Scottish Coca-Cola Tournament

== Results in major championships ==
Tournament	1967	1968	1969	1970	1971	1972	1973	1974	1975	1976	1977
Masters Tournament						T33					
The Open Championship	T36	T31	CUT		T11	T19	T46			CUT	CUT

Note: Bannerman never played in the U.S. Open or PGA Championship.

Did not play

CUT = missed the half-way cut (3rd round cut in 1976 Open Championship)
"T" indicates a tie for a place

== Team appearances ==
Amateur

- England–Scotland boys match (representing Scotland): 1959

Professional

- Ryder Cup (representing Great Britain): 1971
- World Cup (representing Scotland): 1967, 1972
- R.T.V. International Trophy (representing Scotland): 1967
- Double Diamond International (representing Scotland): 1972, 1974
- Marlboro Nations' Cup (representing Scotland): 1972
