= Tryall Golf Club =

Golf club in Jamaica

- Location within Jamaica
- 18.4475°N 78.0583°W

Club information
- Location: Montego Bay, Hanover, Jamaica
- Established: 1958
- Type: Private
- Tota holes: Eighteen
- Tournaments: The Jamaica Classic (1989–1991); Johnnie Walker World Golf Championship (1991–1995)
- Website: www.tryallclub.com
- Designed by: Ralph Plummer
- Length: 6,800 yards (6,200 m)

Tryall Golf Club is a private country club in Hanover Parish, Jamaica, just outside Montego Bay.

Founded in 1958 and designed by Ralph Plummer, it features a 6,800 yard 18-hole course. In 1963, it hosted Shell's Wonderful World of Golf match between Dow Finsterwald and Peter Alliss. It also hosted the LPGA Tour's The Jamaica Classic from 1989 to 1991 and the unofficial PGA Tour event Johnnie Walker World Golf Championship from 1991 to 1995. In 2005, it was voted the Best Golf course in the Caribbean by CaribbeanWorld Magazine.
