= Brian Barnes (golfer) =

Scottish professional golfer (1945–2019)

Personal information
- Full name: Brian William Barnes
- Nationality: Scotland
- Born: 3 June 1945 Addington, Surrey, England
- Died: 9 September 2019 (aged 74) West Sussex, England
- Height: 6 ft 2 in (1.88 m)
- Weight: 238 lb (108 kg; 17.0 st)
- Spouse: Hilary Faulkner (m. 1968; died 2014)

Career
- Sport: Golf
- Turned professional: 1964
- Former tours: European Tour; European Seniors Tour; Champions Tour
- Professional wins: 26

Number of wins by tour
- European Tour: 9
- PGA Tour Champions: 3
- European Senior Tour: 2
- Other: 14

Best results in major championships
- Masters Tournament: CUT: 1972, 1973
- PGA Championship: DNP
- U.S. Open: DNP
- The Open Championship: 5th: 1972

Achievements and awards
- European Seniors Tour Order of Merit winner: 1995

Brian William Barnes (3 June 1945 – 9 September 2019) was a Scottish professional golfer. He won nine times on the European Tour between 1972 and 1981, and twice won the Senior British Open.

Barnes played in six consecutive Ryder Cup matches from 1969 to 1979. He was noted for having beaten Jack Nicklaus twice in one day in singles match play, during the 1975 Ryder Cup on 21 September, winning 4&2 in the morning round and 2&1 in the afternoon session.

== Early life and amateur career ==
Barnes was born in Addington, Surrey, England, to Scottish parents, and represented England at international level. He was educated at St. Dunstan's School, Burnham-on-Sea, and Millfield School in Somerset.

Barnes was taught golf by his father, who was Secretary at Burnham and Berrow Golf Club. He won the British Youths Open Amateur Championship in 1964, having represented England in the youth international against Scotland that preceded the championship. He turned professional soon afterwards.

== Professional career ==
Barnes became one of the "Butten boys", a group of young British professional golfers who were part of a training programme, funded by Ernest Butten, an entrepreneur and joint founder of PA Consulting Group. Starting in 1963, Butten had funded a residential golf school at Sundridge Park in Bromley, Kent. Max Faulkner was employed as the teaching professional.

After turning professional Barnes continued to be considered an English golfer, representing England in the 1967 R.T.V. International Trophy. In 1971 he joined the Scottish PGA and subsequently played for Scotland in international competitions.

Barnes won the Flame Lily Open in Rhodesia in March 1967 and won two British tournaments, the Agfa-Gevaert Tournament and the Coca-Cola Young Professionals' Championship, in 1969. In 1970 he won the Wills Masters in Australia.

Barnes was one of the leading European Tour golfers in the early years after the tour was founded in 1972. He placed between 4th and 8th on the Order of Merit every year from 1972 to 1980. He won nine events on the Tour between 1972 and 1981. He also played regularly on the African Safari Circuit, winning the Zambia Open in 1979 and the Kenya Open and Zambia Open in 1981.

Barnes completed all four rounds of the Open Championship 16 times in succession from 1967 to 1982 and had three top ten finishes, the best of them a tie for fifth in 1972. He played in the Masters Tournament in 1972 and 1973 but missed the cut on both occasions.

Barnes played for Great Britain & Ireland and finally Europe in six consecutive Ryder Cup matches from 1969 to 1979. He has a 10–14–1 win–loss–tie record including a 5–5–0 record in singles matches (there were two sets of singles matches in some of the Ryder Cups in which he participated). He had a successful partnership with Bernard Gallacher in foursomes and four-ball matches, the pair having 5 wins and a half in their 10 matches playing together. He is, however, best remembered for beating Jack Nicklaus twice in one day in 1975.

After the 1984 season, when Barnes fell to 79th on the Order of Merit ranking, he only played a few tournaments the following year and retired to run a golf course in Sussex, England together with Max Faulkner; West Chillington. He made a semi-comeback in 1989 and played a full schedule of 25 tournaments, 46 years old, in 1991, reaching a 4th place finish at the Portuguese Open and finished 12th at the British Masters.

In 1995, Barnes became eligible to play in senior tournaments, and was very successful. He won the Senior British Open Championship in 1995, and became, the following year, the first man to successfully defend the title. He topped the European Seniors Tour Order of Merit in 1995, and went on the play the Champions Tour in the late 1990s with moderate success. Arthritis hampered this recovery and forced him to leave tournament golf in 2000.

Barnes was responsible for one of the worst putting performances ever seen in a professional tournament. During the 1968 French Open, he missed a short putt on the par-3 8th hole. Angry with the miss, he then tried to rake the ball into the cup, but missed. He then hit the ball back and forth while it was still moving. After all of the missed putts and penalty strokes were counted, Barnes had scored a 15 for the hole.

== Personal life ==
Barnes married Hilary Faulkner, the daughter of Max Faulkner, in 1968; they had two children, Didi and Guy. Hilary died in 2014. After having heavy alcohol drinking habits during his life and golf career, in early 1993, Barnes checked himself in for a successful drying-out period, remained sober and continued his golf career, two years later with great success in senior tournaments. Barnes died on 9 September 2019 of cancer, at the age of 74; he was with his son and daughter at home.

== Amateur wins ==
- 1964 British Youths Open Amateur Championship

== Professional wins (26) ==
=== European Tour wins (9) ===
No.	Date	Tournament	Winning score	Margin of victory	Runner(s)-up
1	10 Jun 1972	Martini International	−7 (72-69-70-66=277)	1 stroke	(Australia) Jack Newton
2	11 Aug 1974	Dutch Open	−5 (71-69-71=211) (Note: Shortened to 54 holes due to weather.)	5 strokes	(England) Peter Oosterhuis, (New Zealand) Simon Owen, (England) Glenn Ralph
3	4 May 1975	French Open	−7 (68-69-71-73=281)	2 strokes	(England) Neil Coles, (Republic of Ireland) Eamonn Darcy, (South Africa) Dale Hayes, (Republic of Ireland) John O'Leary
4	5 Sep 1976	Sun Alliance Match Play Championship	4 and 3		(Wales) Craig Defoy
5	22 Apr 1978	Spanish Open	−12 (67-75-70-64=276)	2 strokes	(England) Howard Clark
6	18 Jun 1978	Greater Manchester Open	−5 (69-71-69-66=275)	Playoff	(New Zealand) Bob Charles, (England) Denis Durnian, (England) Nick Job
7	15 Apr 1979	Portuguese Open	−5 (69-75-71-72=287)	2 strokes	(Spain) Francisco Abreu
8	6 May 1979	Italian Open	−7 (73-70-71-67=281)	Playoff	(South Africa) Dale Hayes
9	13 Sep 1981	Haig Whisky TPC	−8 (73-70-71-62=276)	Playoff	(England) Brian Waites

European Tour playoff record (3–2)

No.	Year	Tournament	Opponent(s)	Result
1	1977	Dunlop Masters	(England) Guy Hunt	Lost to par on third extra hole
2	1977	Italian Open	(Spain) Ángel Gallardo	Lost to birdie on fourth extra hole
3	1978	Greater Manchester Open	(New Zealand) Bob Charles, (England) Denis Durnian, (England) Nick Job	Won with birdie on first extra hole
4	1979	Italian Open	(South Africa) Dale Hayes	Won with birdie on fourth extra hole
5	1981	Haig Whisky TPC	(England) Brian Waites	Won with par on fourth extra hole

=== Safari Circuit wins (3) ===
No.	Date	Tournament	Winning score	Margin of victory	Runner(s)-up
1	1 Apr 1979	Zambia Open	−12 (71-64-72-73=280)	3 strokes	(Scotland) Sandy Lyle
2	15 Mar 1981	Benson & Hedges Kenya Open	−10 (65-70-71-68=274)	1 stroke	(Scotland) Bernard Gallacher, (Scotland) Sandy Lyle
3	31 Mar 1981	Zambia Open (2)	−16 (70-67-69-70=276)	1 stroke	(England) Howard Clark, (England) John Morgan

=== Australasian wins (1) ===
- 1970 Wills Masters

=== Other wins (11) ===
- 1967 Flame Lily Open (Rhodesia)
- 1969 Agfa-Gevaert Tournament, Coca-Cola Young Professionals' Championship
- 1977 Skol Tournament
- 1978 Northern Open, Skol Tournament
- 1980 Skol Tournament
- 1981 Scottish Professional Championship
- 1982 Scottish Professional Championship
- 1985 Northern Open
- 1989 Wilson Club Professionals' Championship

=== Senior PGA Tour wins (3) ===
Legend
Senior major championships (2)
Other Senior PGA Tour (1)

No.	Date	Tournament	Winning score	Margin of victory	Runner(s)-up
1	30 Jul 1995	Senior British Open	−7 (67-67-77-70=281)	Playoff	(United States) Bob Murphy
2	28 Jul 1996	Senior British Open (2)	−11 (72-65-66-74=277)	3 strokes	(New Zealand) Bob Charles, (United States) David Oakley
3	21 Jun 1998	AT&T Canada Senior Open Championship	−12 (68-68-68=204)	2 strokes	(United States) Tom Jenkins, (United States) Dana Quigley, (United States) Bruce Summerhays

Senior PGA Tour playoff record (1–0)

No.	Year	Tournament	Opponent	Result
1	1995	Senior British Open	(United States) Bob Murphy	Won with eagle on third extra hole

=== European Seniors Tour wins (2) ===
Legend
Senior major championships (2)
Other European Seniors Tour (0)

No.	Date	Tournament	Winning score	Margin of victory	Runner(s)-up
1	30 Jul 1995	Senior British Open	−7 (67-67-77-70=281)	Playoff	(United States) Bob Murphy
2	28 Jul 1996	Senior British Open (2)	−11 (72-65-66-74=277)	3 strokes	(New Zealand) Bob Charles, (United States) David Oakley

European Seniors Tour playoff record (1–0)

No.	Year	Tournament	Opponent	Result
1	1995	Senior British Open	(United States) Bob Murphy	Won with eagle on third extra hole

== Results in major championships ==
Tournament	1965	1966	1967	1968	1969
Masters Tournament					
The Open Championship	CUT	CUT	T25	T6	T40

Tournament	1970	1971	1972	1973	1974	1975	1976	1977	1978	1979
Masters Tournament			CUT	CUT						
The Open Championship	T32	64	5	T10	T44	T23	14	T36	T34	T50

Tournament	1980	1981	1982	1983	1984	1985	1986	1987	1988	1989
Masters Tournament										
The Open Championship	T58	T14	T35							CUT

Tournament	1990	1991	1992	1993	1994	1995	1996
Masters Tournament							
The Open Championship	CUT						T60

Note: Barnes only played in the Masters Tournament and The Open Championship.

Top 10
Did not play

CUT = missed the half-way cut
"T" indicates a tie for a place

== Senior major championships ==
=== Wins (2) ===
Year	Championship	Winning score	Margin	Runner(s)-up
1995	Senior British Open	−7 (67-67-77-70=281)	Playoff^{1}	(United States) Bob Murphy
1996	Senior British Open (2)	−11 (72-65-66-74=277)	3 strokes	(New Zealand) Bob Charles, (United States) David Oakley

^{1}Defeated Murphy with an eagle on the third hole of a sudden-death playoff.

=== Results timeline ===
Tournament	1995	1996	1997	1998	1999	2000
The Tradition			24	30	T9	WD
Senior PGA Championship		T4	T23	CUT	WD	WD
U.S. Senior Open	T11	T17	T49	T4	WD	T58
Senior Players Championship		3	WD	T39	T14	T12
The Senior Open Championship	1	1	WD	3	T27	WD

Win
Top 10
Did not play

CUT = missed the halfway cut
"T" indicates a tie for a place

== Team appearances ==
- Ryder Cup (representing Great Britain and Ireland/Europe): 1969 (tie), 1971, 1973, 1975, 1977, 1979
- World Cup (representing Scotland): 1974, 1975, 1976, 1977
- R.T.V. International Trophy (representing England): 1967 (winners)
- Double Diamond International (representing Scotland): 1972, 1973 (winners), 1974 (captain), 1975 (captain), 1976 (captain), 1977 (captain)
- Marlboro Nations' Cup/Philip Morris International (representing Scotland): 1972, 1973 (winners), 1976
- Sotogrande Match/Hennessy Cognac Cup (representing Great Britain and Ireland): 1974 (winners), 1976 (winners), 1978 (winners), 1980 (winners, captain)
- Datsun International (representing Great Britain and Ireland): 1976
- PGA Cup (representing Europe): 1990

== See also ==
- Fall 1969 PGA Tour Qualifying School graduates
- List of golfers with most European Tour wins
