= The Open For The Ages =

The Open for the Ages

Tournament information
- Dates: 16-19 July 2020
- Location: St Andrews, Fife, Scotland
- Course(s): Old Course, St Andrews Links

Statistics
- Par: 72
- Length: 7,305 yards (6,680 m)
- Field: 21 players
- Cut: none

Champion
- (United States) Jack Nicklaus
- 272 (−16)

The Open For The Ages is a special made-for-television fictional edition of The Open Championship tournament of golf. Utilizing data analysis, a fan vote and 50 years of Open archive footage, it features 21 famous golfers including previous Open champions from various eras at the peak of their careers competing on the Old Course at St Andrews for the Claret Jug and the title of Champion Golfer. The event aired from 16-19 July 2020 – the same dates that the 2020 Open Championship was supposed to be held at Royal St George's Golf Club before being canceled by the global COVID-19 pandemic, which further led the tournament organizers to create the event.

Nick Dougherty, Ewen Murray and Iona Stephen provided commentary, with highlight videos being released for the first three rounds and the full final round being broadcast on Sunday, including on Sky Sports in the United Kingdom and the Golf Channel on NBC in the United States.

== Course ==
Hole	Name	Yards	Par	Hole	Name	Yards	Par
1	Burn	376	4	10	Bobby Jones	386	4
2	Dyke	453	4	11	High (In)	174	3
3	Cartgate (Out)	397	4	12	Heathery (In)	348	4
4	Ginger Beer	480	4	13	Hole O'Cross (In)	465	4
5	Hole O'Cross (Out)	568	5	14	Long	618	5
6	Heathery (Out)	412	4	15	Cartgate (In)	455	4
7	High (Out)	371	4	16	Corner of the Dyke	423	4
8	Short	175	3	17	Road	495	4
9	End	352	4	18	Tom Morris	357	4
Out		3,584	36	In		3,721	36
Source:				Total		7,305	72

== Entrants ==
The 21 players chosen were all major champions, with all but two having been named Champion Golfer of the Year at least once. Between them, they had won 107 major championships including 43 Open Championships in seven different decades. They represented nine countries between them and included the major championship victory record holder in Jack Nicklaus (18) and the last man to hold all four major championships at once in Tiger Woods (2000 U.S. Open, 2000 Open Championship, 2000 PGA Championship and 2001 Masters), as well as three career Grand Slam winners in Gary Player, Nicklaus and Woods.

In chronological order of first achieving best Open Championship result

Player	Country	Best Open Finish (Venues/Years)	Total Majors
Peter Thomson	Australia	5 wins (Royal Birkdale 1954, St Andrews 1955, Royal Liverpool 1956, Royal Lytham & St Annes 1958, Royal Birkdale 1965)	5
Gary Player	South Africa	3 wins (Muirfield 1959, Carnoustie 1968, Royal Lytham & St Annes 1974)	9
Arnold Palmer	United States	2 wins (Royal Birkdale 1961, Royal Troon 1962)	7
Jack Nicklaus	United States	3 wins (Muirfield 1966, St Andrews 1970, St Andrews 1978)	18
Lee Trevino	United States	2 wins (Royal Birkdale 1971, Muirfield 1972)	6
Tom Watson	United States	5 wins (Carnoustie 1975, Turnberry 1977, Muirfield 1980, Royal Troon 1982, Royal Birkdale 1983)	8
Seve Ballesteros	Spain	3 wins (Royal Lytham & St Annes 1979, St Andrews 1984, Royal Lytham & St Annes 1988)	5
Greg Norman	Australia	2 wins (Turnberry 1986, Royal St George's 1993)	2
Nick Faldo	England	3 wins (Muirfield 1987, St Andrews 1990, Muirfield 1992)	6
Fred Couples	United States	2 3rd places (Royal Birkdale 1991, St Andrews 2005)	1
José María Olazábal	Spain	2 3rd places (Muirfield 1992, St Andrews 2005)	2
Nick Price	Zimbabwe	1 win (Turnberry 1994)	3
John Daly	United States	1 win (St Andrews 1995)	2
Tiger Woods	United States	3 wins (St Andrews 2000, St Andrews 2005, Royal Liverpool 2006)	15
Ernie Els	South Africa	2 wins (Muirfield 2002, Royal Lytham & St Annes 2012)	4
Pádraig Harrington	Ireland	2 wins (Carnoustie 2007, Royal Birkdale 2008)	3
Louis Oosthuizen	South Africa	1 win (St Andrews 2010)	1
Rory McIlroy	Northern Ireland	1 win (Royal Liverpool 2014)	4
Zach Johnson	United States	1 win (St Andrews 2015)	2
Henrik Stenson	Sweden	1 win (Royal Troon 2016)	1
Jordan Spieth	United States	1 win (Royal Birkdale 2017)	3

== Final leaderboard ==
The winner was determined by a fan vote registering more than 10,000 responses, and a data model developed in partnership with regular Open Championship sponsor NTT Data utilizing the fan vote along with player career statistics and historical data from The Open to calculate who would win the Claret Jug during this dream event. Added weight was given to performance at St Andrews.

Jack Nicklaus, who was judged the Champion Golfer over runner-up Tiger Woods by a single shot, said,

"Well, it's very nice. I'm very flattered that enough people thought that I played decent golf, that they voted for me."

Asked about how such a clash of eras might be in real life with each player at his best, he said,

"I think it would have been fun. I think we all would like to do it. I'd like to see how Bobby Jones played and I'm sure Bobby Jones would have liked to see how we played. But I think Champions in all eras would be Champions in other eras. If you're a good player, you're a good player. The equipment's different, the game's different, but I think they would adjust to it."

The final leaderboard ran thus:

Place	Player	Country	Final Round	Total Score	Total To Par
1	Jack Nicklaus	United States	68	272	-16
2	Tiger Woods	United States	69	273	-15
3	Seve Ballesteros	Spain	69	274	-14
T4	Tom Watson	United States	70	275	-13
T4	Nick Faldo	England	70	275	-13
T6	Rory McIlroy	Northern Ireland	63	276	-12
T6	Louis Oosthuizen	South Africa	70	276	-12
8	Jordan Spieth	United States	71	277	-11
9	John Daly	United States	72	278	-10
T10	Ernie Els	South Africa	66	279	-9
T10	Zach Johnson	United States	66	279	-9
12	Greg Norman	Australia	67	281	-7
13	Henrik Stenson	Sweden	69	282	-6
T14	Lee Trevino	United States	69	283	-5
T14	Pádraig Harrington	Ireland	70	283	-5
T16	Nick Price	Zimbabwe	71	284	-4
T16	José María Olazábal	Spain	69	284	-4
T18	Peter Thomson	Australia	71	285	-3
T18	Fred Couples	United States	70	285	-3
T18	Gary Player	South Africa	71	285	-3
21	Arnold Palmer	United States	71	286	-2
