= 2008 WGC-Bridgestone Invitational =

Coordinates: 41.008°N 81.508°W

Tournament information
- Dates: July 31 – August 3, 2008
- Location: Akron, Ohio, U.S.
- Course(s): Firestone Country Club
- Tour(s): PGA Tour; European Tour

Statistics
- Par: 70
- Length: 7,400
- Field: 80 players
- Cut: None
- Prize fund: $8,000,000
- Winner's share: $1,350,000

Champion
- (Fiji) Vijay Singh
- 270 (−10)

The 2008 WGC-Bridgestone Invitational was a golf tournament that was contested from July 31 – August 3, 2008 over the South Course at Firestone Country Club in Akron, Ohio. It was the tenth WGC-Bridgestone Invitational tournament, and the third of three World Golf Championships events held in 2008.

Vijay Singh won the tournament, and claimed his first World Golf Championships title. He shot a 10-under par 270 to win over Stuart Appleby and Lee Westwood by one stroke.

== Field ==
1. Playing members of the 2007 United States and International Presidents Cup teams
Stuart Appleby (3,4), Woody Austin (3,4), Ángel Cabrera (3,4,5), K. J. Choi (3,4,5), Stewart Cink (2,3,4,5), Ernie Els (3,4,5), Jim Furyk (2,3,4), Lucas Glover, Retief Goosen (3,4), Charles Howell III, Trevor Immelman (3,4), Zach Johnson (2,3,4), Hunter Mahan (3,4), Phil Mickelson (2,3,4,5), Geoff Ogilvy (3,4,5), Nick O'Hern, Rory Sabbatini (3,4), Adam Scott (3,4,5), Vijay Singh (3,4), Steve Stricker (3,4,5), David Toms (2), Scott Verplank (2,3,4)

- Mike Weir (3,4,5) and Tiger Woods (2,3,4,5) did not play.

2. Playing members of the 2006 United States and European Ryder Cup teams
Chad Campbell, Paul Casey (3,4), Darren Clarke (5), Chris DiMarco, Sergio García (3,4,5), Pádraig Harrington (3,4,5), J. J. Henry, David Howell, Robert Karlsson (3,4), Paul McGinley, Colin Montgomerie, Henrik Stenson (3,4), Vaughn Taylor, Lee Westwood (3,4,5)

- Luke Donald (3,4), José María Olazábal, and Brett Wetterich did not play.

3. Top 50 players from the Official World Golf Rankings two weeks prior to event
Robert Allenby (4), Stephen Ames (4,5), Aaron Baddeley (4), Tim Clark (4), Niclas Fasth (4), Richard Green (4), Søren Hansen (4,5), Trevor Immelman (4,5), Freddie Jacobson (4), Miguel Ángel Jiménez (4,5), Martin Kaymer (4,5), Anthony Kim (4,5), Justin Leonard (4,5), Graeme McDowell (4,5), Rocco Mediate (4), Sean O'Hair (4,5), Rod Pampling (4), Kenny Perry (4,5), Ian Poulter (4,5), Andrés Romero (4,5), Justin Rose (4,5), Brandt Snedeker (4), Boo Weekley (4,5), Oliver Wilson (4)

4. Top 50 players from the Official World Golf Rankings one week prior to event

5. Tournament winners of worldwide events since the prior year's tournament with an Official World Golf Ranking Strength of Field Rating of 115 points or more
Mark Brown, Daniel Chopra, Nick Dougherty, Richard Finch, Ross Fisher, Steve Flesch, J. B. Holmes, Brendan Jones, James Kingston, Pablo Larrazábal, Peter Lonard, Steve Lowery, Craig Parry, Chez Reavie, Brett Rumford, Scott Strange, D. J. Trahan, Johnson Wagner, Steve Webster

6. The winner of selected tournaments from each of the following tours:

- Japan Golf Tour: Japan Golf Tour Championship (2008) – Hidemasa Hoshino
- PGA Tour of Australasia: Australian PGA Championship (2007) – Peter Lonard, qualified in category 5
- Sunshine Tour: Vodacom Championship (2008) – James Kingston, qualified in category 5
- Asian Tour: Volvo Masters of Asia (2007) – Prayad Marksaeng

== Round summaries ==
=== First round ===
Place	Player	Score	To par
1	(South Africa) Retief Goosen	66	−4
T2	(Sweden) Daniel Chopra	67	−3
T2	(South Africa) Tim Clark	67	−3
T2	(United States) Zach Johnson	67	−3
T2	(Fiji) Vijay Singh	67	−3
T6	(United States) Chad Campbell	68	−2
T6	(United States) Stewart Cink	68	−2
T6	(United States) Chris DiMarco	68	−2
T6	(United States) Jim Furyk	68	−2
T6	(United States) Charles Howell III	68	−2
T6	(United States) Justin Leonard	68	−2
T6	(United States) Rocco Mediate	68	−2
T6	(United States) Phil Mickelson	68	−2
T6	(United States) Sean O'Hair	68	−2
T6	(United States) Chez Reavie	68	−2
T6	(United States) Brandt Snedeker	68	−2
T6	(Australia) Scott Strange	68	−2
T6	(United States) Steve Stricker	68	−2
T6	(England) Steve Webster	68	−2

=== Second round ===
Place	Player	Score	To par
1	(Fiji) Vijay Singh	67-66=133	−7
2	(United States) Phil Mickelson	68-66=134	−6
T3	(United States) Zach Johnson	67-68=135	−5
T3	(Australia) Peter Lonard	69-66=135	−5
T3	(United States) Sean O'Hair	68-67=135	−5
T3	(England) Lee Westwood	70-65=135	−5
T7	(Australia) Stuart Appleby	70-66=136	−4
T7	(United States) Stewart Cink	68-68=136	−4
T7	(Spain) Miguel Ángel Jiménez	70-66=136	−4
T7	(South Africa) Rory Sabbatini	69-67=136	−4
T7	(United States) D. J. Trahan	69-67=136	−4

=== Third round ===
Place	Player	Score	To par
T1	(United States) Phil Mickelson	68-66-68=202	−8
T1	(Fiji) Vijay Singh	67-66-69=202	−8
T1	(England) Lee Westwood	70-65-67=202	−8
4	(Australia) Stuart Appleby	70-66-67=203	−7
5	(South Africa) Retief Goosen	66-71-68=205	−5
T6	(Northern Ireland) Darren Clarke	70-71-65=206	−4
T6	(United States) Chris DiMarco	68-70-68=206	−4
T6	(Spain) Miguel Ángel Jiménez	70-66-70=206	−4
T6	(South Africa) Rory Sabbatini	69-67-70=206	−4
T6	(United States) D. J. Trahan	69-67-70=206	−4

=== Final round ===
Place	Player	Score	To par	Winnings ($)
1	(Fiji) Vijay Singh	67-66-69-68=270	−10	1,350,000
T2	(Australia) Stuart Appleby	70-66-67-68=271	−9	635,000
T2	(England) Lee Westwood	70-65-67-69=271	−9	635,000
T4	(South Africa) Retief Goosen	66-71-68-67=272	−8	310,000
T4	(United States) Phil Mickelson	68-66-68-70=272	−8	310,000
T6	(Northern Ireland) Darren Clarke	70-71-65-67=273	−7	220,000
T6	(Australia) Peter Lonard	69-66-72-66=273	−7	220,000
T8	(England) Paul Casey	70-71-68-65=274	−6	162,500
T8	(United States) D. J. Trahan	69-67-70-68=274	−6	162,500
T10	(Spain) Miguel Ángel Jiménez	70-66-70-69=275	−5	133,000
T10	(United States) Hunter Mahan	71-66-70-68=275	−5	133,000

==== Scorecard ====
Hole	1	2	3	4	5	6	7	8	9	10	11	12	13	14	15	16	17	18
Par	4	5	4	4	3	4	3	4	4	4	4	3	4	4	3	5	4	4
(Fiji) Singh	−8	−9	−10	−11	−11	−12	−12	−11	−11	−11	−10	−11	−10	−10	−10	−10	−10	−10
(Australia) Appleby	−7	−7	−6	−6	−6	−6	−6	−6	−6	−6	−7	−7	−7	−7	−7	−8	−9	−9
(England) Westwood	−9	−10	−10	−9	−9	−9	−7	−8	−8	−8	−9	−9	−10	−9	−9	−9	−9	−9
(South Africa) Goosen	−5	−6	−7	−7	−7	−7	−7	−7	−7	−7	−8	−7	−7	−7	−7	−8	−8	−8
(United States) Mickelson	−8	−9	−9	−9	−10	−10	−10	−10	−10	−10	−11	−11	−11	−11	−10	−10	−9	−8

Cumulative tournament scores, relative to par

Birdie	Bogey	Double bogey
