= Vijay Singh =

Fijian professional golfer (born 1963)

Vijay Singh CF विजय सिंह (Fiji Hindi)
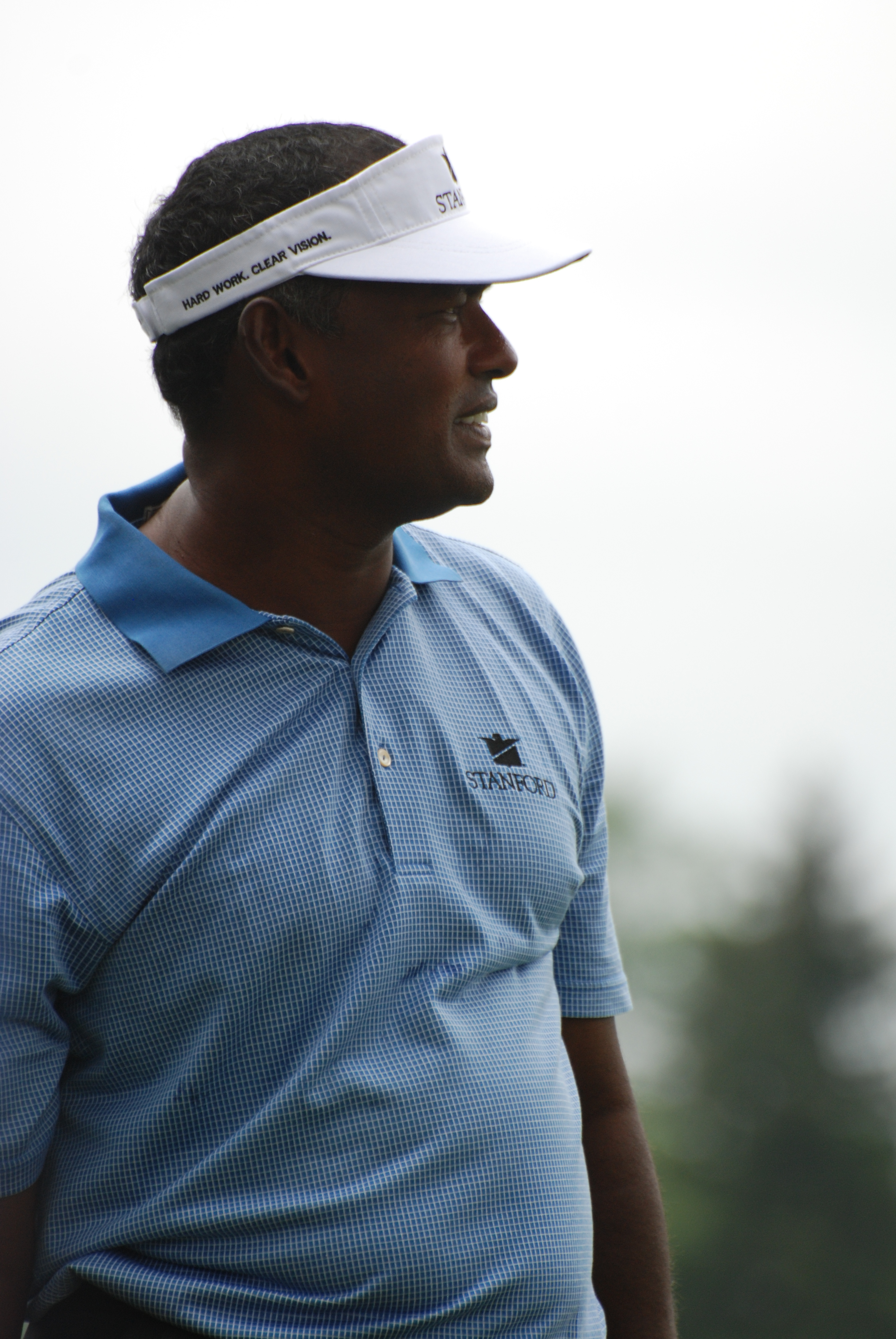
- Singh at the 2009 U.S. Open

Personal information
- Full name: Vijay Singh
- Nickname: The Big Fijian
- Nationality: Fiji
- Born: 22 February 1963 (age 63) Lautoka, Fiji
- Height: 6 ft 2 in (188 cm)
- Weight: 208 lb (94 kg; 14.9 st)
- Spouse: Ardena Seth (m. 1985)
- Children: 1

Career
- Sport: Golf
- Turned professional: 1982
- Current tours: PGA Tour; PGA Tour Champions; European Senior Tour
- Former tours: European Tour; Asian Tour
- Professional wins: 67
- Highest ranking: 1 (5 September 2004) (32 weeks)

Number of wins by tour
- PGA Tour: 34
- European Tour: 13
- Asian Tour: 5
- Sunshine Tour: 2
- PGA Tour Champions: 6
- Other: 14

Best results in major championships (wins: 3)
- Masters Tournament: Won: 2000
- PGA Championship: Won: 1998, 2004
- U.S. Open: T3: 1999
- The Open Championship: T2: 2003

Achievements and awards
- World Golf Hall of Fame: 2005/2006 (member page)
- PGA Tour Rookie of the Year: 1993
- PGA Tour money list winner: 2003, 2004, 2008
- PGA Tour Player of the Year: 2004
- PGA Player of the Year: 2004
- Byron Nelson Award: 2004
- Vardon Trophy: 2004
- European Tour Golfer of the Year: 2004
- PGA Tour FedEx Cup winner: 2008

Vijay Singh CF (Fiji Hindi: विजय सिंह, pronounced [ˈʋɪdʒəj sɪ̃ɦ]; born 22 February 1963) is a Fijian professional golfer. In 1982, Singh turned professional and played on the local Asia Golf Circuit. However, his early career met with controversy, as he was accused of numerous rules violations, and he was banned from the AGC. Singh turned to Africa and Europe where he had much success on the respective tours, the Safari Circuit and European Tour, winning several times on each. In 1993, he won the PGA Tour's Buick Classic, earning him tour membership and ultimately Rookie of the Years honours. In 1998, he won his first major championship, the PGA Championship, and two years later the Masters. In 2004, Singh had one of the best seasons in the history of golf, winning nine times including the PGA Championship, overtaking Tiger Woods as the #1 golfer in the world.

== Early life ==
An Indo-Fijian practising Hinduism, Singh was born in Lautoka, during the period of British colonial rule in Fiji and grew up in Nadi. He is the son of Mohan Singh, an airplane technician who also taught golf. Singh has a brother named Krishna who is also a professional golfer.

Singh recollected to reporters about his childhood: "When we were kids we couldn't afford golf balls so we had to make do with coconuts. My father used to say, 'Little Vijay, golf balls don't fall off trees you know,' so I found some that did!" Growing up, he played snooker, cricket, football, and the country's most popular sport, rugby. Growing up, he admired the swing of Tom Weiskopf, using it as an early model for his own.

== Professional career ==
=== Asia Golf Circuit ===
Singh turned professional in 1982. Two years later, he won the 1984 Malaysian PGA Championship. However, his career was plunged into crisis after he was suspended from the Asia Golf Circuit in 1985 over allegations he doctored his scorecard. It was alleged that he lowered his score from one over to one under in order to make the cut, but Singh denies this, saying that in any case, it should only have resulted in disqualification from the event rather than a ban. After investigation by the Tour of this and other alleged violations proved true, John Bender, Asian PGA Tour president, issued Singh a lifetime ban on Asian PGA Tour play.

Singh felt he had been more harshly treated because the marker was "the son of a VIP in the Indonesian PGA." He then took a job at the Keningau Club in Sabah, Malaysia, before his move to the Miri Golf Club in Sarawak. While this was a period of hardship for him, he continued to gain experience.

=== European Tour ===
Singh saved the money he needed to resurrect his career and began to re-enter tournaments. In 1988 he teamed up with a sponsor, Red Baron, which funded a trip to Africa to compete on the now-defunct Safari Circuit, an offshoot circuit of the European Tour. Singh captured his first event, the 1988 Nigerian Open, as locals cheered him loudly. At the end of that year he entered the European Tour Qualifying school for the second consecutive year, and was successful on this occasion.

In 1989, Singh won his first European Tour title at the Volvo Open Championship in Italy and finished 24th on the European Tour Order of Merit, putting his early struggles firmly behind him. He won four times in 1989, at the Volvo Open di Firenze, Ivory Coast Open, Nigerian Open and Zimbabwe Open. He also finished tied for 23rd at The Open Championship. He won on the European Tour again in 1990 and did so twice in 1992. He also won several tournaments in Asia and Africa in this period.

=== PGA Tour ===
Singh earned membership on the PGA Tour in 1993 by winning the Buick Classic in a playoff over Mark Wiebe. That victory led to his being named the 1993 PGA Tour Rookie of the Year. After being hampered with back and neck problems in 1994, he came back to win the Buick Classic again in 1995 as well as the Phoenix Open. After playing well in 1996 (but with no victories), he won both the Memorial Tournament and the Buick Open in 1997.

In 1998, Singh was victorious at the PGA Championship at Sahalee Country Club in Sammamish, Washington, playing a 70-66-67-68 over the four days (the 66 tied a course record) and earning him his first Major title. He followed this up by winning The Masters in 2000, with a three-stroke victory over Ernie Els.

Singh did not win on the PGA Tour in 2001, but finished the year with a Tour-best 14 top-10 finishes and was fourth on the money list with $3,440,829 for the year. In 2002, he won at the Shell Houston Open at TPC at The Woodlands, setting a new tournament 72-hole scoring record with a 266, and at the Tour Championship, winning by two strokes over Charles Howell III.

2003 proved to be a very successful year for Singh. He won four tournaments, had 18 top-10 finishes and was the PGA Tour's money leader (and had the second-highest single-season total in PGA Tour history) with $7,573,907, beating Tiger Woods by $900,494, though Singh played 27 tournaments compared to Woods' 18 tournaments. Singh also tied a 9-hole scoring record at the U.S. Open with a 29 on the back nine of his second round. His victories came at the Phoenix Open, the EDS Byron Nelson Championship, the John Deere Classic and the FUNAI Classic at the Walt Disney World Resort. He narrowly lost the vote for the PGA of America's Player of the Year to Tiger Woods.

However, the 2003 season was also spotted with controversy involving Singh surrounding the year's event at the Bank of America Colonial. LPGA star Annika Sörenstam became the first woman to play at a PGA Tour event since Babe Zaharias at the 1945 Los Angeles Open. Surrounding this fervor, Singh was misquoted as having said that Sörenstam "didn't belong" on the men's tour and that he would not play if he were paired with her. What he actually said is that he would not be paired with her because his playing partner was being selected from the past champion's pool. Singh later clarified, "There are guys out there trying to make a living. It's not a ladies' tour. If she wants to play, she should—or any other woman for that matter—if they want to play the man's tour, they should qualify and play like everybody else."

Singh began 2004 by winning the AT&T Pebble Beach National Pro-Am at −16 and winning $954,000 in prize money. This was his first win on tour in 2004 and his 16th all-time on the PGA Tour. It was his 12th consecutive top-10 finish, which is two shy of Jack Nicklaus' all-time record.

Singh won the final major of 2004, winning the PGA Championship, his third major, in a three-hole aggregate playoff over Justin Leonard and Chris DiMarco. Singh was the leader by one shot over Leonard going into the final round, but made no birdies in the final round, finishing regulation at 67-68-69-76=280. His final round of 76 was the highest winning score by a major champion since 1955. The playoff was a tense affair, and Singh's birdie on the first playoff hole, his first birdie of the day, proved to be the difference.

On 6 September 2004 (Labor Day), Singh won the Deutsche Bank Championship in Norton, Massachusetts. With the win, he overtook Tiger Woods at the top of the Official World Golf Ranking, ending Woods' streak of 264 weeks at the top of the golf world.

Singh finished the 2004 season with a career-best nine victories, 18 top-10s, and a record $10,905,166 in earnings and was named the PGA Tour's and PGA of America's Player of the Year. The former award is decided by a vote of active PGA Tour players.

Despite picking up a win early in 2005, Singh lost his world number 1 ranking when Tiger Woods won the Ford Championship at Doral on 6 March, but just two weeks later he took it back again after notching up top-three finishes in three consecutive weeks. Following Woods' win at the 2005 Masters, Singh once again lost his place as World No. 1 in the Official World Golf Ranking and finished tied for fifth place. In April, he became the youngest living person elected to the World Golf Hall of Fame, garnering 56% of the ballot. Thirty-year-old Karrie Webb was inducted into the Hall of Fame in October 2005, but Singh remained the youngest living electee, as Webb qualified for the Hall without an election process. (The 19th century great Tom Morris, Jr., who was elected in 1975, died at age 24.) Singh deferred his induction for a year, and it took place in October 2006.

In 2006, Singh played enough European Tour events to be listed on the European Tour Order of Merit title for the first time since 1995.

At the start of the 2007 season, Singh won the Mercedes-Benz Championship which was the first FedEx Cup event in PGA Tour history. This win got Singh his 18th tour win over the age of 40, surpassing Sam Snead as most over 40 wins, and making all-time over 40 tour winner. He won again at The Arnold Palmer Invitational in March, but did not win for the rest of the year which turned into a disappointing year for Singh. He did not finish in a top ten of a major for the first time in ten years and finished 10th in the FedEx Cup race. He went through swing changes during the end of 2007 which resulted in weeks of missed cuts and staying outside the top ten through the Presidents Cup.

A new swing brought big changes for Singh in 2008, although he had good opportunities at Pebble Beach and Bay Hill, he was not competing at a high level for the first half of the year. His game was plagued by poor putting for the better part of two years, but his season started to turn around with a tie for fifth at the Travelers Championship. After missing the cut at The Open Championship, Singh won the WGC-Bridgestone Invitational in early August for his first win of the year and first World Golf Championship. His win had been a relief after missing short putts throughout the week. He missed the cut the following two weeks including at Oakland Hills for the PGA Championship and entered the PGA Tour FedEx Cup playoffs ranked 7th in the standings. At the first playoff event, Singh prevailed for his first FedEx Cup win defeating Sergio García and Kevin Sutherland in a playoff. On the first playoff hole García and Singh matched long birdie putts before Singh won with birdie on the second playoff hole. Singh was propelled into first place in the FedEx Cup race with three events remaining. At the second event of the playoffs, he triumphed once again, this time at the Deutsche Bank Championship bewildering the field with a five strokes victory and a final round 63. He had won three times in his last five starts and created an almost insurmountable lead in the points race. He would not contend in the remaining two events, but by playing in both the 2008 FedEx Cup title belonged to Singh. His season which looked to be a major disappointment in July turned into an historic year for Singh: he won the PGA Tour money list for the third time in his career and he surpassed Harry Cooper for most PGA Tour wins of all time for a non-American.

Singh has won 22 times on the PGA Tour since turning 40 – beating the record previously set by Sam Snead. He is the second man to reach $60 million in PGA Tour career earnings, after Tiger Woods. His 34 career victories are the most on the PGA Tour by a non-American player and place him 14th on the all-time list. He has spent over 540 weeks ranked in the top 10 of the Official World Golf Ranking. Singh's longevity on the PGA Tour and his number of wins earn him a lifetime exemption on the PGA Tour.

Kenny Perry, another player who found success at a late age is good friends with Singh, who calls him "Biggie". Of Singh, Perry said "Vijay has always been good to me. We talk a lot. He wants to know how my family is doing. I think the world of him."

After the 2008 playoffs, Singh announced his withdrawal from a couple of Asian Tour events because of a nagging back injury and was advised by doctors to rest. He missed two and a half months, returning to win Tiger Woods's tournament, the Chevron World Challenge at Sherwood Country Club in California in December. It was his first victory in the event. During the start of the 2009 season Singh announced that he would miss three weeks after undergoing arthroscopic surgery to repair a torn meniscus in his right knee. Singh had a mediocre 2009 season, with no top 5 finishes and ended the year with his lowest ever ranking on the PGA Tour money list in 68th.

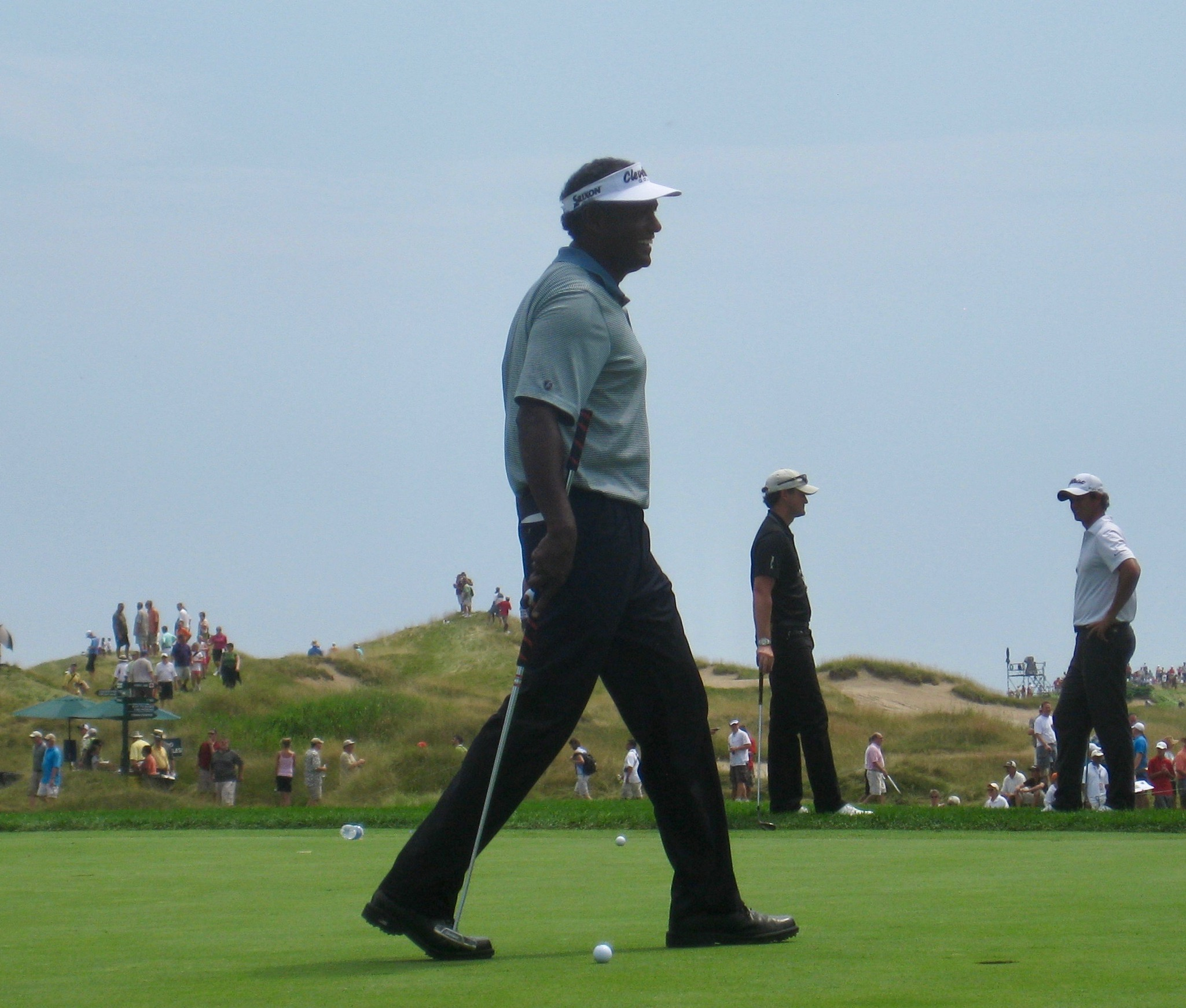
Singh at the 2010 PGA Championship

His poor form continued into 2010, resulting in him being 66th on the PGA Tour money list. He dropped out of the top 50 in the world rankings for the first time since the early 1990s.

After returning from knee surgery, Singh started the 2011 season making five out of his first five cuts. In February, Singh was in contention to win his first PGA Tour Title since 2008 at the Waste Management Phoenix Open in Scottsdale, Arizona. Despite shooting a final round 66, Singh finished two shots behind Jason Dufner and eventual winner Mark Wilson. A couple of weeks later, Singh was in contention again, this time at the Northern Trust Open at Riviera Country Club. However, he came up short again, not helped by back-to-back bogeys on holes 12 and 13. He would eventually finish two shots back of the winner Aaron Baddeley, although he did secure second spot on his own. This early season form however was not enough to secure a spot at the opening World Golf Championship of the year, the WGC-Accenture Match Play Championship the following week. However, at number 10 in the 2011 FedEx Cup standings, it was just enough to secure a spot at the WGC-Cadillac Championship in March.

On 6 June 2011, Singh missed his tee-time for the U.S. Open qualifying in Columbus, Ohio. At the time, this ended the longest active streak of consecutive majors played by a professional golfer, at 67.

On 30 January 2013, Singh admitted to using deer-antler spray while not knowing that it is a banned substance. The PGA Tour later dropped its case against him. On 8 May 2013, Singh sued the PGA Tour for exposing him to public humiliation and ridicule during a 12-week investigation into his use of deer-antler spray. On 20 November 2018, the PGA Tour and Singh announced that the lawsuit had been settled. The PGA Tour confirmed that it does not believe that Singh intended to gain an unfair advantage over his fellow competitors in this matter. Other terms of the settlement were not announced.

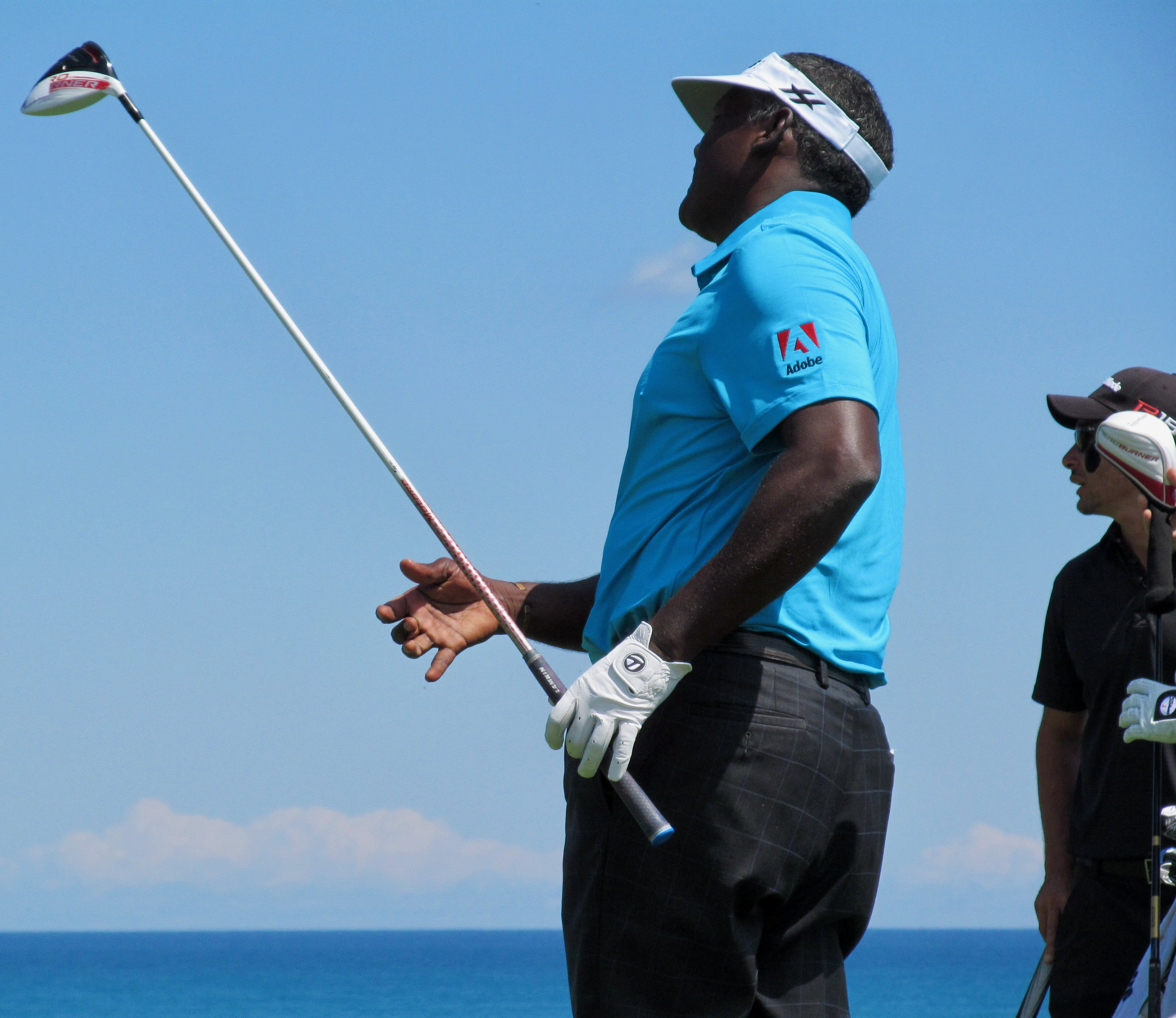
Singh at the 2015 PGA Championship

=== PGA Tour Champions ===
Singh played his first PGA Tour Champions event in 2013, finishing T6 at the Pacific Links Hawai'i Championship. During this era, he still played some PGA Tour events, finishing second at the Quicken Loans National, three strokes behind winner Billy Hurley III.

In 2017, Singh won his first senior event, the Bass Pro Shops Legends of Golf with Carlos Franco. In March 2018, Singh won the Toshiba Classic. Four months later, in July, Singh won one of the PGA Tour Champions' major tournaments, the Constellation Senior Players Championship in a playoff over Jeff Maggert. At the end of the season, in November, Singh won the season-ending Charles Schwab Cup Championship in Phoenix, Arizona. The victory was worth $440,000. By winning the tournament, he also finished fourth in the season-long Charles Schwab Cup, winning an additional $200,000.

In March 2019, Singh shot his way into the final group of the final round of the Honda Classic. Singh shot even-par to finish sixth, three strokes behind winner Keith Mitchell.

In 2026, Singh returned to the PGA Tour using a one-time exemption for those in the top-50 in career earnings. Singh, whose career earnings are over $71 million, is eligible for most full-field events and the Masters as a former winner.

== Personal life ==
Singh has been married to Ardena Seth since 1985 and they have one child together.

A resident of Ponte Vedra Beach, Florida, he is known for his preparation, often arriving hours before, and staying long after his tournament rounds to work on his game on the driving range.

== Media relations ==
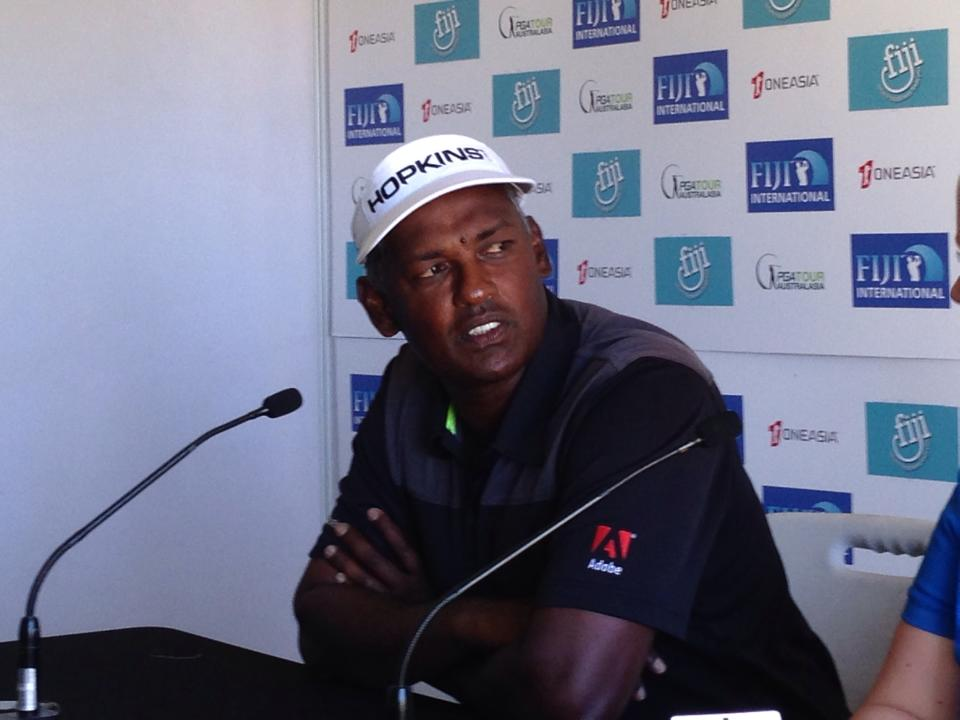
Singh at a press conference in 2014

Controversy surrounded Singh in 2003 before the Bank of America Colonial. Annika Sörenstam was scheduled to play the event, and Singh was quoted as saying, "I hope she misses the cut ... because she doesn't belong out here." He later said that the substance of his interview to an Associated Press reporter was that she would be displacing some other struggling male player, for whom he had his sympathies. However, the media focused on this statement. Golf Digest wrote that Singh had become "pro golf's bad guy."

After Singh's win at the Masters, Ernie Els took issue with some of the negative press his friend received. He wrote an article in Sports Illustrated to defend him, saying, "Golf should be proud of Vijay Singh." Later Els said of Singh "He's a wonderful guy. I've known him for the better part of 10 years now. He's a great competitor. I think people have a misconception of Vijay. He's a really good guy."

In May 2005, Singh was appointed a goodwill ambassador for Fiji. He said that he did not expect anything in return from the Fijian government for representing his country. At a press conference on 18 May 2005, Singh commented on what he said was a deterioration in race relations in Fiji, saying that for such a small country, people of all races should live together, put their differences aside, and get on with life. Relations between Indo-Fijians and indigenous Fijians had been more harmonious when he was younger, he said.

== Awards and honors ==
- In 1993, Singh won the PGA Tour's Rookie of the Year honors.
- In 2003, 2004, and 2008 he finished atop the PGA Tour's money list.
- In 2004, Singh was voted by his colleagues to be PGA Tour Player of the Year.
- In 2004, he also earned PGA Player of the Year honors, based on a points-based system, from the PGA of America.
- In 2004, Singh also earned the PGA Tour's Byron Nelson Award and the PGA of America's Vardon Trophy. The honors respectively go the player with the lowest adjusted scoring average over the course of the year and the overall leader in scoring average, non-adjusted.
- In 2004, Singh was European Tour Golfer of the Year, dispensed by the golf media figures in Europe.
- In 2006, Singh was elected to the World Golf Hall of Fame.
- In 2008, he won the season-long FedEx Cup.

== Professional wins (67) ==
=== PGA Tour wins (34) ===
Legend
Major championships (3)
World Golf Championships (1)
Tour C'ships/FedEx Cup playoff events (3)
Other PGA Tour (27)

No.	Date	Tournament	Winning score	Margin of victory	Runner(s)-up
1	13 Jun 1993	Buick Classic	−4 (72-68-74-66=280)	Playoff	(United States) Mark Wiebe
2	29 Jan 1995	Phoenix Open	−15 (70-67-66-66=269)	Playoff	(United States) Billy Mayfair
3	21 May 1995	Buick Classic (2)	−6 (70-69-67-72=278)	Playoff	(United States) Doug Martin
4	2 Jun 1997	Memorial Tournament	−14 (70-65-67=202) (Note: Shortened to 54 holes due to weather.)	2 strokes	(United States) Jim Furyk, (Australia) Greg Norman
5	10 Aug 1997	Buick Open	−15 (67-73-67-66=273)	4 strokes	(United States) Tom Byrum, (United States) Russ Cochran, (South Africa) Ernie Els, (United States) Brad Fabel, (Japan) Naomichi Ozaki, (United States) Curtis Strange
6	16 Aug 1998	PGA Championship	−9 (70-66-67-68=271)	2 strokes	(United States) Steve Stricker
7	23 Aug 1998	Sprint International	47 pts (15-12-6-14=47)	6 points	(United States) Phil Mickelson, (United States) Willie Wood
8	14 Mar 1999	Honda Classic	−11 (71-69-68-69=277)	2 strokes	(United States) Payne Stewart
9	9 Apr 2000	Masters Tournament	−10 (72-67-70-69=278)	3 strokes	(South Africa) Ernie Els
10	31 Mar 2002	Shell Houston Open	−22 (67-65-66-68=266)	6 strokes	(Northern Ireland) Darren Clarke
11	3 Nov 2002	The Tour Championship	−12 (65-71-65-67=268)	2 strokes	(United States) Charles Howell III
12	26 Jan 2003	Phoenix Open (2)	−23 (67-66-65-63=261)	3 strokes	(United States) John Huston
13	18 May 2003	EDS Byron Nelson Championship	−15 (65-65-69-66=265)	2 strokes	(Zimbabwe) Nick Price
14	15 Sep 2003	John Deere Classic	−16 (66-68-69-65=268)	4 strokes	(United States) Jonathan Byrd, (United States) J. L. Lewis, (United States) Chris Riley
15	26 Oct 2003	Funai Classic at the Walt Disney World Resort	−23 (64-65-69-67=265)	4 strokes	(United States) Stewart Cink, (United States) Scott Verplank, (United States) Tiger Woods
16	8 Feb 2004	AT&T Pebble Beach National Pro-Am	−16 (67-68-68-69=272)	3 strokes	(United States) Jeff Maggert
17	26 Apr 2004	Shell Houston Open (2)	−11 (74-66-69-68=277)	2 strokes	(United States) Scott Hoch
18	3 May 2004	HP Classic of New Orleans	−22 (70-65-68-63=266)	1 stroke	(United States) Phil Mickelson, (United States) Joe Ogilvie
19	1 Aug 2004	Buick Open (2)	−23 (63-70-65-67=265)	1 stroke	(United States) John Daly
20	15 Aug 2004	PGA Championship (2)	−8 (67-68-69-76=280)	Playoff	(United States) Chris DiMarco, (United States) Justin Leonard
21	6 Sep 2004	Deutsche Bank Championship	−16 (68-63-68-69=268)	3 strokes	(Australia) Adam Scott, (United States) Tiger Woods
22	12 Sep 2004	Bell Canadian Open	−9 (68-66-72-69=275)	Playoff	(Canada) Mike Weir
23	26 Sep 2004	84 Lumber Classic	−15 (64-68-72-69=273)	1 stroke	(United States) Stewart Cink
24	31 Oct 2004	Chrysler Championship	−18 (65-69-67-65=266)	5 strokes	(United States) Tommy Armour III, (Sweden) Jesper Parnevik
25	16 Jan 2005	Sony Open in Hawaii	−11 (69-68-67-65=269)	1 stroke	(South Africa) Ernie Els
26	24 Apr 2005	Shell Houston Open (3)	−13 (64-71-70-70=275)	Playoff	(United States) John Daly
27	8 May 2005	Wachovia Championship	−12 (70-69-71-66=276)	Playoff	(United States) Jim Furyk, (Spain) Sergio García
28	31 Jul 2005	Buick Open (3)	−24 (65-66-63-70=264)	4 strokes	(United States) Zach Johnson, (United States) Tiger Woods
29	11 Jun 2006	Barclays Classic (3)	−10 (70-64-72-68=274)	2 strokes	(Australia) Adam Scott
30	7 Jan 2007	Mercedes-Benz Championship	−14 (69-69-70-70=278)	2 strokes	(Australia) Adam Scott
31	18 Mar 2007	Arnold Palmer Invitational	−8 (70-68-67-67=272)	2 strokes	(United States) Rocco Mediate
32	3 Aug 2008	WGC-Bridgestone Invitational	−10 (67-66-69-68=270)	1 stroke	(Australia) Stuart Appleby, (England) Lee Westwood
33	24 Aug 2008	The Barclays (4)	−8 (70-70-66-70=276)	Playoff	(Spain) Sergio García, (United States) Kevin Sutherland
34	1 Sep 2008	Deutsche Bank Championship (2)	−22 (64-66-69-63=262)	5 strokes	(Canada) Mike Weir

PGA Tour playoff record (8–4)

No.	Year	Tournament	Opponent(s)	Result
1	1993	Buick Classic	(United States) Mark Wiebe	Won with birdie on third extra hole
2	1995	Phoenix Open	(United States) Billy Mayfair	Won with par on first extra hole
3	1995	Buick Classic	(United States) Doug Martin	Won with birdie on fifth extra hole
4	1998	The Tour Championship	(United States) Hal Sutton	Lost to birdie on first extra hole
5	2004	PGA Championship	(United States) Chris DiMarco, (United States) Justin Leonard	Won three-hole aggregate playoff; Singh: −1 (3-3-4=10), DiMarco: x (4-3-x=x), Leonard: x (4-3-x=x)
6	2004	Bell Canadian Open	(Canada) Mike Weir	Won with par on third extra hole
7	2005	The Honda Classic	(Republic of Ireland) Pádraig Harrington, (United States) Joe Ogilvie	Harrington won with par on second extra hole Ogilvie eliminated by par on first hole
8	2005	Shell Houston Open	(United States) John Daly	Won with par on first extra hole
9	2005	Wachovia Championship	(United States) Jim Furyk, (Spain) Sergio García	Won with par on fourth extra hole García eliminated by par on first hole
10	2006	Mercedes Championships	(Australia) Stuart Appleby	Lost to birdie on first extra hole
11	2008	AT&T Pebble Beach National Pro-Am	(United States) Steve Lowery	Lost to birdie on first extra hole
12	2008	The Barclays	(Spain) Sergio García, (United States) Kevin Sutherland	Won with birdie on second extra hole Sutherland eliminated by birdie on first hole

=== European Tour wins (13) ===
Legend
Major championships (3)
World Golf Championships (1)
Other European Tour (9)

No.	Date	Tournament	Winning score	Margin of victory	Runner(s)-up
1	2 Apr 1989	Volvo Open Championship	−12 (72-68-68-68=276)	3 strokes	(Australia) Peter Fowler
2	8 Apr 1990	El Bosque Open	−10 (66-69-74-69=278)	2 strokes	(England) Richard Boxall, (South Africa) Chris Williams
3	16 Feb 1992	Turespaña Masters Open de Andalucía	−11 (72-70-69-66=277)	2 strokes	(England) Gary Evans
4	23 Aug 1992	Volvo German Open	−26 (66-68-64-64=262)	11 strokes	(Spain) José Manuel Carriles
5	31 Jul 1994	Scandinavian Masters	−20 (68-67-69-64=268)	3 strokes	(Zimbabwe) Mark McNulty
6	25 Sep 1994	Trophée Lancôme	−17 (65-63-69-66=263)	1 stroke	(Spain) Miguel Ángel Jiménez
7	9 Feb 1997	South African Open^{1}	−18 (69-66-66-69=270)	1 stroke	(Zimbabwe) Nick Price
8	16 Aug 1998	PGA Championship	−9 (70-66-67-68=271)	2 strokes	(United States) Steve Stricker
9	9 Apr 2000	Masters Tournament	−10 (72-67-70-69=278)	3 strokes	(South Africa) Ernie Els
10	18 Feb 2001	Carlsberg Malaysian Open^{2}	−14 (68-70-68-68=274)	Playoff	(Republic of Ireland) Pádraig Harrington
11	25 Feb 2001	Caltex Singapore Masters^{2}	−21 (64-63-68-68=263)	2 strokes	(England) Warren Bennett
12	15 Aug 2004	PGA Championship (2)	−8 (67-68-69-76=280)	Playoff	(United States) Chris DiMarco, (United States) Justin Leonard
13	3 Aug 2008	WGC-Bridgestone Invitational	−10 (67-66-69-68=270)	1 stroke	(Australia) Stuart Appleby, (England) Lee Westwood

^{1}Co-sanctioned by the Southern Africa Tour
^{2}Co-sanctioned by the Asian Tour

European Tour playoff record (2–0)

No.	Year	Tournament	Opponent(s)	Result
1	2001	Carlsberg Malaysian Open	(Republic of Ireland) Pádraig Harrington	Won with birdie on third extra hole
2	2004	PGA Championship	(United States) Chris DiMarco, (United States) Justin Leonard	Won three-hole aggregate playoff; Singh: −1 (3-3-4=10), DiMarco: x (4-3-x=x), Leonard: x (4-3-x=x)

=== Asian Tour wins (5) ===
No.	Date	Tournament	Winning score	Margin of victory	Runner(s)-up
1	2 Sep 1995	Passport Open	−16 (70-72-65-65=272)	1 stroke	(India) Jeev Milkha Singh
2	10 Sep 2000	Johnnie Walker Taiwan Open	−1 (73-72-71-71=287)	Playoff	(South Africa) Craig Kamps
3	18 Feb 2001	Carlsberg Malaysian Open^{1}	−14 (68-70-68-68=274)	Playoff	(Republic of Ireland) Pádraig Harrington
4	25 Feb 2001	Caltex Singapore Masters^{1}	−21 (64-63-68-68=263)	2 strokes	(England) Warren Bennett
5	7 Oct 2007	Kolon-Hana Bank Korea Open^{2}	−6 (66-69-70-73=278)	2 strokes	(South Korea) Kim Kyung-tae, (South Korea) Yang Yong-eun

^{1}Co-sanctioned by the European Tour
^{2}Co-sanctioned by the Korean Tour

Asian Tour playoff record (2–0)

No.	Year	Tournament	Opponent	Result
1	2000	Johnnie Walker Taiwan Open	(South Africa) Craig Kamps	Won with par on first extra hole
2	2001	Carlsberg Malaysian Open	(Republic of Ireland) Pádraig Harrington	Won with birdie on third extra hole

=== Asia Golf Circuit wins (1) ===
No.	Date	Tournament	Winning score	Margin of victory	Runners-up
1	15 Mar 1992	Benson & Hedges Malaysian Open	−9 (65-67-74-69=275)	3 strokes	(Taiwan) Hsieh Chin-sheng, (Australia) Brad King, (United States) Craig McClellan, (Sri Lanka) Nandasena Perera, (United States) Lee Porter

=== Southern Africa Tour wins (2) ===
No.	Date	Tournament	Winning score	Margin of victory	Runner-up
1	10 Jan 1993	Bell's Cup	−10 (73-69-68-68=278)	2 strokes	(Zimbabwe) Mark McNulty
2	9 Feb 1997	South African Open^{1}	−18 (69-66-66-69=270)	1 stroke	(Zimbabwe) Nick Price

^{1}Co-sanctioned by the European Tour

=== Safari Circuit wins (4) ===
No.	Date	Tournament	Winning score	Margin of victory	Runner(s)-up
1	31 Jan 1988	Nigerian Open	−3 (281)	Playoff	(Scotland) Mike Miller
2	29 Jan 1989	Zimbabwe Open	−6 (72-67-71-72=282)	2 strokes	(Wales) Mark Mouland
3	19 Nov 1989	Nigerian Open (2)	−5 (71-68-72-68=279)	1 stroke	(England) Gordon J. Brand, (England) Jeff Pinsent, (England) Ian Spencer
4	26 Nov 1989	Ivory Coast Open	−14 (70-65-65-74=274)	1 stroke	(England) Jeff Pinsent

=== Swedish Golf Tour wins (1) ===
No.	Date	Tournament	Winning score	Margin of victory	Runner-up
1	7 Aug 1988	Länsförsäkringar Open	−6 (70-70-69-73=282)	1 stroke	(Sweden) Jesper Parnevik

=== Other wins (8) ===
No.	Date	Tournament	Winning score	Margin of victory	Runner(s)-up
1	8 Dec 1984	Malaysian PGA Championship	−2 (286)	1 stroke	(Malaysia) Nazamuddin Yusof
2	24 Nov 1991	Hassan II Golf Trophy	−7 (70-73-71-71=285)	Playoff	(United States) Payne Stewart
3	12 Oct 1997	Toyota World Match Play Championship	1 up		(South Africa) Ernie Els
4	10 Nov 1998	Johnnie Walker Super Tour	−19 (70-66-71-62=269)	2 strokes	(South Africa) Ernie Els
5	24 Jul 2001	Telus Skins Game	$180,000	$105,000	(United States) David Duval
6	24 Jun 2003	Telus Skins Game (2)	$140,000	$45,000	(Canada) Ian Leggatt
7	21 Dec 2008	Chevron World Challenge	−11 (71-72-67-67=277)	1 stroke	(United States) Steve Stricker
8	18 Dec 2022	PNC Championship (with son Qass Singh)	−26 (59-59=118)	2 strokes	(United States) John Daly and son John Daly II, (United States) Justin Thomas and father Mike Thomas

Other playoff record (1–2)

No.	Year	Tournament	Opponent(s)	Result
1	1991	Hassan II Golf Trophy	(United States) Payne Stewart	Won with birdie on first extra hole
2	1995	Johnnie Walker World Golf Championship	(United States) Fred Couples, (United States) Loren Roberts	Couples won with birdie on second extra hole
3	2000	PGA Grand Slam of Golf	(United States) Tiger Woods	Lost to eagle on first extra hole

=== PGA Tour Champions wins (6) ===
Legend
PGA Tour Champions major championships (1)
Charles Schwab Cup playoff events (1)
Other PGA Tour Champions (4)

No.	Date	Tournament	Winning score	Margin of victory	Runner(s)-up
1	23 Apr 2017	Bass Pro Shops Legends of Golf (with (Paraguay) Carlos Franco)	−15 (51-42=93)	1 stroke	(United States) Fred Funk and (United States) Jeff Sluman, (United States) Paul Goydos and (United States) Kevin Sutherland, (United States) Corey Pavin and (United States) Duffy Waldorf
2	11 Mar 2018	Toshiba Classic	−11 (68-68-66=202)	1 stroke	(United States) Scott McCarron, (United States) Tom Pernice Jr., (United States) Tommy Tolles
3	15 Jul 2018	Constellation Senior Players Championship	−20 (68-67-66-67=268)	Playoff	(United States) Jeff Maggert
4	11 Nov 2018	Charles Schwab Cup Championship	−22 (67-67-67-61=262)	4 strokes	(United States) Tim Petrovic
5	27 Aug 2023	The Ally Challenge	−14 (66-68-68=202)	1 stroke	(United States) Jeff Maggert
6	18 Oct 2026	SAS Championship	−9 (69-69-69=207)	2 strokes	(South Africa) Ernie Els

PGA Tour Champions playoff record (1–0)

No.	Year	Tournament	Opponent	Result
1	2018	Constellation Senior Players Championship	(United States) Jeff Maggert	Won with birdie on second extra hole

== Major championships ==
=== Wins (3) ===
Year	Championship	54 holes	Winning score	Margin	Runner(s)-up
1998	PGA Championship	Tied for lead	−9 (70-66-67-68=271)	2 strokes	(United States) Steve Stricker
2000	Masters Tournament	3 shot lead	−10 (72-67-70-69=278)	3 strokes	(South Africa) Ernie Els
2004	PGA Championship (2)	1 shot lead	−8 (67-68-69-76=280)	Playoff^{1}	(United States) Chris DiMarco, (United States) Justin Leonard

^{1}Defeated Justin Leonard and Chris DiMarco in three-hole playoff: Singh (3-3-4=10), Leonard (4-3-x=x), and DiMarco (4-3-x=x)

=== Results timeline ===
Results not in chronological order in 2020.

Tournament	1989	1990	1991	1992	1993	1994	1995	1996	1997	1998	1999
Masters Tournament						T27	CUT	T39	T17	CUT	T24
U.S. Open					CUT		T10	T7	T77	T25	T3
The Open Championship	T23	T12	T12	T51	T59	T20	T6	T11	T38	T19	CUT
PGA Championship				T48	4	CUT	CUT	T5	T13	1	T49

Tournament	2000	2001	2002	2003	2004	2005	2006	2007	2008	2009
Masters Tournament	1	T18	7	T6	T6	T5	T8	T13	T14	T30
U.S. Open	T8	T7	T30	T20	T28	T6	T6	T20	T65	T27
The Open Championship	T11	T13	CUT	T2	T20	T5	CUT	T27	CUT	T38
PGA Championship	CUT	T51	8	T34	1	T10	CUT	CUT	CUT	T16

Tournament	2010	2011	2012	2013	2014	2015	2016	2017	2018
Masters Tournament	CUT	CUT	T27	T38	T37	54	CUT	CUT	49
U.S. Open	T40		CUT						
The Open Championship	T37		T9	CUT			CUT		
PGA Championship	T39	CUT	T36	T68	T35	T37	CUT	66	78

Tournament	2019	2020	2021	2022	2023	2024	2025	2026
Masters Tournament	CUT	WD	CUT	CUT	CUT	T58		CUT
PGA Championship								
U.S. Open								
The Open Championship		NT						

Win
Top 10
Did not play

CUT = missed the half way cut
WD = withdrew
"T" indicates a tie for a place.
NT = no tournament due to COVID-19 pandemic

=== Summary ===
Tournament	Wins	2nd	3rd	Top-5	Top-10	Top-25	Events	Cuts made
Masters Tournament	1	0	0	2	6	11	32	20
PGA Championship	2	0	0	4	6	8	27	19
U.S. Open	0	0	1	1	7	10	18	16
The Open Championship	0	1	0	2	4	13	25	19
Totals	3	1	1	9	23	42	102	74

- Most consecutive cuts made – 15 (2002 PGA – 2006 U.S. Open)
- Longest streak of top-10s – 7 (2004 PGA – 2006 U.S. Open)

== Results in The Players Championship ==
Tournament	1993	1994	1995	1996	1997	1998	1999
The Players Championship	T28	T55	T43	T8	T31	T54	T20

Tournament	2000	2001	2002	2003	2004	2005	2006	2007	2008	2009
The Players Championship	T33	2	CUT	CUT	T13	T12	T8	T44	CUT	T9

Tournament	2010	2011	2012	2013	2014	2015	2016	2017	2018	2019
The Players Championship	CUT	CUT	CUT	CUT		T63	T28	T16		CUT

Top 10
Did not play

CUT = missed the halfway cut
"T" indicates a tie for a place

== World Golf Championships ==
=== Wins (1) ===
Year	Championship	54 holes	Winning score	Margin	Runners-up
2008	WGC-Bridgestone Invitational	Tied for lead	−10 (67-66-69-68=270)	1 stroke	(Australia) Stuart Appleby, (England) Lee Westwood

=== Results timeline ===
Tournament	1999	2000	2001	2002	2003	2004	2005	2006	2007	2008	2009	2010	2011	2012
Match Play	R32	R64	R32	R32		R32	R32	R16	R32	QF	R32	R64		
Championship	T16	T3	NT^{1}	3	T2		T6	T56	T11	T2	T53	T11	T22	T66
Invitational	T15		T13	T11	T6	T32	T3	T45	T56	1	T29	T58		
Champions														

^{1}Cancelled due to 9/11

Win
Top 10
Did not play

QF, R16, R32, R64 = Round in which player lost in match play
"T" = tied
NT = No tournament
Note that the HSBC Champions did not become a WGC event until 2009.

== Senior major championships ==
=== Wins (1) ===
Year	Championship	54 holes	Winning score	Margin	Runners-up
2018	Constellation Senior Players Championship	1 shot deficit	−20 (68-67-66-67=268)	Playoff	(United States) Jeff Maggert

=== Results timeline ===
Results not in chronological order

Tournament	2014	2015	2016	2017	2018	2019	2020	2021	2022	2023	2024	2025	2026
Senior PGA Championship				2	T19	T21	NT	T30		T8	T57	T8	T22
The Tradition				64	T19	T43	NT	62		T15	T39	T19	T20
U.S. Senior Open	T5		T18	T7	T16	T24	NT	T26	T33	T18	7	63	T42
Senior Players Championship			WD	T18	1	T18	T43	T12	T31	T32	T49	T21	T11
Senior British Open Championship					T14		NT	CUT	CUT	3	CUT		

Win
Top 10
Did not play

CUT = missed the halfway cut
WD = withdrew
"T" indicates a tie for a place
NT = no tournament due to COVID-19 pandemic

== PGA Tour career summary ==
Season	Wins (Majors)	Earnings ($)	Rank
1993	1	657,831	19
1994	0	325,959	52
1995	2	1,018,713	9
1996	0	855,140	17
1997	2	1,059,236	16
1998	2 (1)	2,238,998	2
1999	1	2,283,233	4
2000	1 (1)	2,573,835	5
2001	0	3,440,829	4
2002	2	3,756,563	3
2003	4	7,573,907	1
2004	9 (1)	10,905,166	1
2005	4	8,017,336	2
2006	1	4,602,416	4
2007	2	4,728,376	3
2008	3	6,601,094	1
2009	0	1,276,815	68
2010	0	1,334,262	66
2011	0	2,371,050	28
2012	0	1,586,305	51
2013	0	309,351	162
2014	0	989,028	97
2015	0	752,462	124
2016	0	1,210,104	88
2017	0	337,305	173
2018	0	95,334	210
2019	0	244,800	198
2020	0	20,088	234
Career*	34 (3)	71,236,216	4

*As of the 2020 season.
There is a summary of Singh's European Tour career here.

== Team appearances ==
Amateur

- Eisenhower Trophy (representing Fiji): 1980

Professional

- Presidents Cup (International Team): 1994, 1996, 1998 (winners), 2000, 2003 (tie), 2005, 2007, 2009
- World Cup (representing Fiji): 2001, 2002, 2013
- Alfred Dunhill Challenge (representing Australasia): 1995

== See also ==
- List of golfers with most PGA Tour wins
- List of golfers with most European Tour wins
- List of golfers with most Asian Tour wins
- List of men's major championships winning golfers
- Longest PGA Tour win streaks
- Most PGA Tour wins in a year
- Pravasi Bharatiya Divas
- Pravasi Bharatiya Samman
