= 2000 Masters Tournament =

American golf tournament held in 2000

- Front cover of the 2000 Masters Journal

Tournament information
- Dates: April 6–9, 2000
- Location: Augusta, Georgia; 33.503°N 82.020°W
- Course: Augusta National Golf Club
- Organized by: Augusta National Golf Club
- Tours: PGA Tour; European Tour; Japan Golf Tour

Statistics
- Par: 72
- Length: 6,985 yards (6,387 m)
- Field: 95 players, 57 after cut
- Cut: 148 (+4)
- Prize fund: US$4,600,000
- Winner's share: $828,000

Champion
- (Fiji) Vijay Singh
- 278 (−10)

Location map
- Location in the United States Location in Georgia

The 2000 Masters Tournament was the 64th Masters Tournament, held April 6–9 at Augusta National Golf Club in Augusta, Georgia. Vijay Singh won his only Masters, three strokes ahead of runner-up Ernie Els. It was the second of Singh's three major titles.

== Course ==
Hole	Name	Yards	Par	Hole	Name	Yards	Par
1	Tea Olive	410	4	10	Camellia	485	4
2	Pink Dogwood	575	5	11	White Dogwood	455	4
3	Flowering Peach	350	4	12	Golden Bell	155	3
4	Flowering Crab Apple	205	3	13	Azalea	485	5
5	Magnolia	435	4	14	Chinese Fir	405	4
6	Juniper	180	3	15	Firethorn	500	5
7	Pampas	365	4	16	Redbud	170	3
8	Yellow Jasmine	550	5	17	Nandina	425	4
9	Carolina Cherry	430	4	18	Holly	405	4
Out		3,500	36	In		3,485	36
Source:				Total		6,985	72

== Field ==
Each player is classified according to the first category by which he qualified, with other categories in which he qualified shown in parentheses.

1. Masters champions

Tommy Aaron, Seve Ballesteros, Gay Brewer, Billy Casper, Charles Coody, Fred Couples (16,17), Ben Crenshaw, Nick Faldo, Raymond Floyd, Doug Ford, Bernhard Langer (10), Sandy Lyle, Larry Mize, Jack Nicklaus, José María Olazábal (16,17), Mark O'Meara (3,16,17), Arnold Palmer, Gary Player, Craig Stadler, Tom Watson, Tiger Woods (4,11,14,15,16,17), Ian Woosnam (10), Fuzzy Zoeller

- George Archer, Jack Burke Jr., Bob Goalby, Herman Keiser, Byron Nelson, Sam Snead, and Art Wall Jr. did not play.

2. U.S. Open champions (last five years)

Ernie Els (14,16,17), Lee Janzen (10,16,17), Steve Jones, Corey Pavin

- Payne Stewart, the 1999 U.S. Open champion, died in a plane crash in October 1999.

3. The Open champions (last five years)

John Daly, Paul Lawrie (16,17), Tom Lehman (14,16,17), Justin Leonard (5,13,14,16,17)

4. PGA champions (last five years)

Mark Brooks, Steve Elkington (10,14,16,17), Davis Love III (10,14,16,17), Vijay Singh (11,14,16,17)

5. The Players Championship winners (last three years)

David Duval (10,11,14,16,17), Hal Sutton (11,14,16,17)

6. U.S. Amateur champion and runner-up

David Gossett (a), Kim Sung-yoon (a)

7. The Amateur champion

Graeme Storm (a)

8. U.S. Amateur Public Links champion

Hunter Haas (a)

9. U.S. Mid-Amateur champion

Danny Green (a)

10. Top 16 players and ties from the 1999 Masters

Bob Estes (14,16,17), Carlos Franco (14,16,17), Jim Furyk (14,16,17), Brandt Jobe, Phil Mickelson (11,14,16,17), Colin Montgomerie (16,17), Greg Norman (16), Steve Pate (14,16,17), Nick Price (14,16,17), Lee Westwood (16,17)

11. Top eight players and ties from the 1999 U.S. Open

Tim Herron (14,16,17), Jeff Maggert (14,16,17), Steve Stricker (16,17)

12. Top four players and ties from 1999 PGA Championship

Stewart Cink (14,16,17), Sergio García (16,17), Jay Haas

13. Top four players and ties from the 1999 Open Championship

Ángel Cabrera, Craig Parry (14,16,17), Jean van de Velde

14. Top 40 players from the 1999 PGA Tour money list

Stuart Appleby (16,17), Notah Begay III, Glen Day (16,17), Fred Funk (16), Brent Geiberger (16,17), Scott Gump, Dudley Hart (16,17), Gabriel Hjertstedt, Scott Hoch (16,17), John Huston (16,17), Skip Kendall, Rocco Mediate, Jesper Parnevik (15,16,17), Dennis Paulson, Chris Perry (16,17), Loren Roberts (16), Jeff Sluman (16,17), David Toms (16,17), Ted Tryba, Duffy Waldorf, Mike Weir (17)

- Since Payne Stewart finished in the top 40 of the money list, an invitation was given to Hjertstedt, the 41st-place finisher.

15. Top 3 players from the 2000 PGA Tour money list on March 5

Kirk Triplett (17)

16. Top 50 players from the final 1999 world ranking

Thomas Bjørn (17), Darren Clarke (17), Retief Goosen (17), Pádraig Harrington, Miguel Ángel Jiménez (17), Masashi Ozaki (17), Naomichi Ozaki (17), Bob Tway (17), Brian Watts (17)

17. Top 50 players from world ranking published March 5

Paul Azinger, Shigeki Maruyama

18. Special foreign invitation

Aaron Baddeley (a)

All the amateurs except Danny Green were playing in their first Masters, as were Notah Begay III, Ángel Cabrera, Brent Geiberger, Pádraig Harrington, Skip Kendall, Paul Lawrie, Dennis Paulson, Jean van de Velde, and Mike Weir. Sergio García made his first appearance as a professional.

== Round summaries ==
=== First round ===
Thursday, April 6, 2000

Place	Player	Score	To par
1	(United States) Dennis Paulson	68	−4
2	(United States) Tom Lehman	69	−3
T3	(Spain) Sergio García	70	−2
T3	(United States) Steve Stricker	70	−2
T5	(Denmark) Thomas Bjørn	71	−1
T5	(United States) Steve Jones	71	−1
T5	(Germany) Bernhard Langer	71	−1
T5	(United States) Rocco Mediate	71	−1
T5	(United States) Phil Mickelson	71	−1
T10	(United States) Tommy Aaron	72	E
T10	(United States) Paul Azinger	72	E
T10	(United States) Mark Brooks	72	E
T10	(Northern Ireland) Darren Clarke	72	E
T10	(South Africa) Ernie Els	72	E
T10	(United States) Bob Estes	72	E
T10	(England) Nick Faldo	72	E
T10	(United States) Justin Leonard	72	E
T10	(Spain) José María Olazábal	72	E
T10	(Japan) Masashi Ozaki	72	E
T10	(Fiji) Vijay Singh	72	E
T10	(United States) Hal Sutton	72	E

=== Second round ===
Friday, April 7, 2000

Place	Player	Score	To par
1	(United States) David Duval	73-65=138	−6
T2	(South Africa) Ernie Els	72-67=139	−5
T2	(United States) Phil Mickelson	71-68=139	−5
T2	(Fiji) Vijay Singh	72-67=139	−5
T5	(United States) Steve Jones	71-70=141	−3
T5	(United States) Tom Lehman	69-72=141	−3
T7	(Spain) Sergio García	70-72=142	−2
T7	(South Africa) Retief Goosen	73-69=142	−2
T7	(Germany) Bernhard Langer	71-71=142	−2
T7	(United States) Loren Roberts	73-69=142	−2
T7	(United States) Jeff Sluman	73-69=142	−2

Amateurs: Gossett (+2), Baddeley (+5), Green (+5), Kim (+6), Haas (+9), Storm (+15).

=== Third round ===
Saturday, April 8, 2000 & Sunday, April 9, 2000

The third round was suspended by darkness due to two-hour rain delay and completed on Sunday morning.

Place	Player	Score	To par
1	(Fiji) Vijay Singh	72-67-70=209	−7
2	(United States) David Duval	73-65-74=212	−4
T3	(South Africa) Ernie Els	72-67-74=213	−3
T3	(United States) Loren Roberts	73-69-71=213	−3
T5	(United States) Davis Love III	75-72-68=215	−1
T5	(United States) Phil Mickelson	71-68-76=215	−1
T5	(Canada) Mike Weir	75-70-70=215	−1
T5	(United States) Tiger Woods	75-72-68=215	−1
T9	(United States) Tom Lehman	69-72-75=216	E
T9	(Zimbabwe) Nick Price	74-69-73=216	E

=== Final round ===
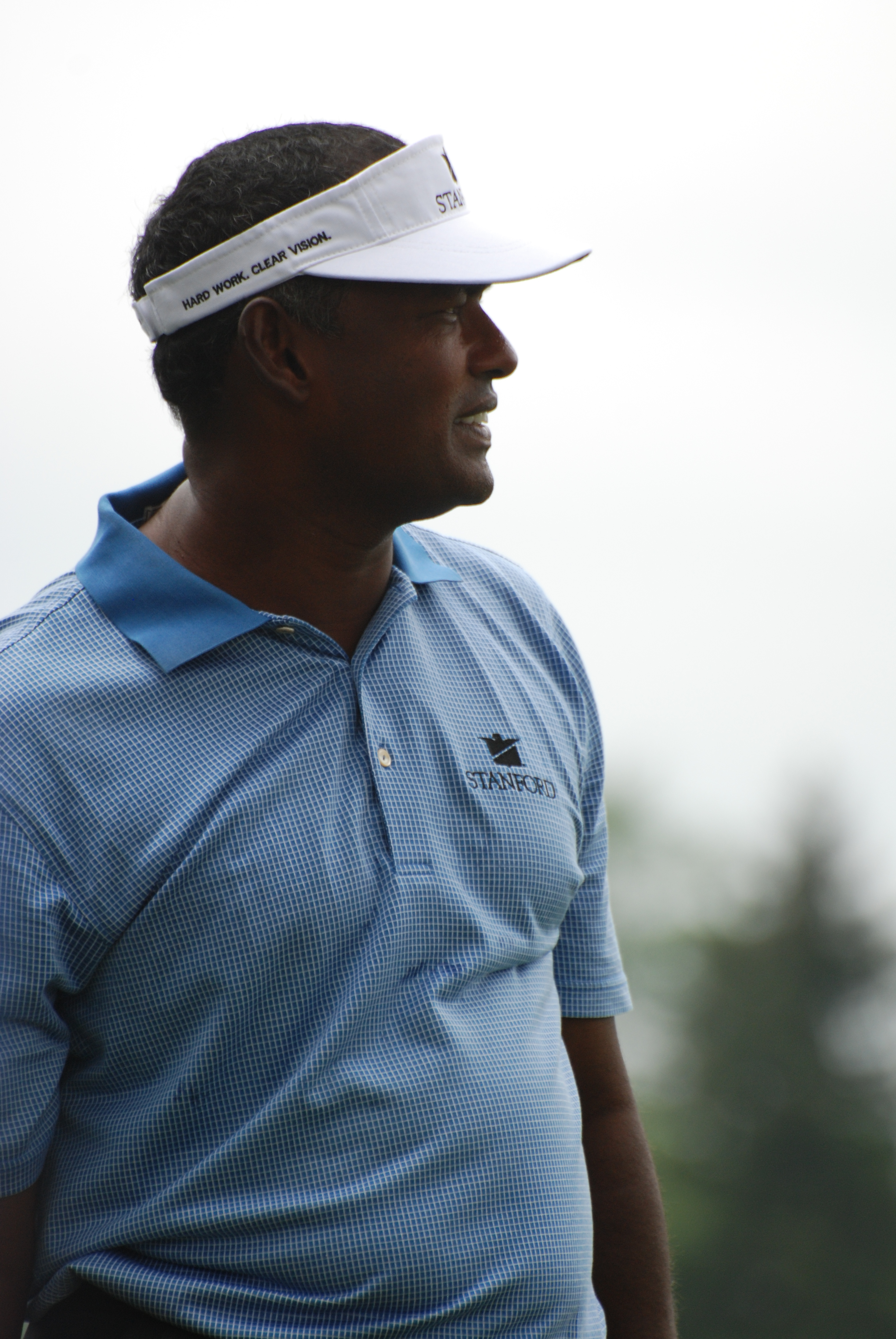
Vijay Singh won his first Masters title

External videos
- Full final round coverage on CBS on YouTube

Sunday, April 9, 2000

==== Final leaderboard ====
Champion
Silver Cup winner (low amateur)
(a) = amateur
(c) = past champion

Top 10
Place	Player	Score	To par	Money (US$)
1	(Fiji) Vijay Singh	72-67-70-69=278	−10	828,000
2	(South Africa) Ernie Els	72-67-74-68=281	−7	496,800
T3	(United States) David Duval	73-65-74-70=282	−6	266,800
T3	(United States) Loren Roberts	73-69-71-69=282	−6	266,800
5	(United States) Tiger Woods (c)	75-72-68-69=284	−4	184,000
6	(United States) Tom Lehman	69-72-75-69=285	−3	165,600
T7	(Paraguay) Carlos Franco	79-68-70-69=286	−2	143,367
T7	(United States) Davis Love III	75-72-68-71=286	−2	143,367
T7	(United States) Phil Mickelson	71-68-76-71=286	−2	143,367
10	(United States) Hal Sutton	72-75-71-69=287	−1	124,200

Leaderboard below the top 10
Place	Player	Score	To par	Money ($)
T11	(United States) Fred Couples (c)	76-72-70-70=288	E	105,800
T11	(Australia) Greg Norman	80-68-70-70=288	E	105,800
T11	(Zimbabwe) Nick Price	74-69-73-72=288	E	105,800
T14	(United States) Jim Furyk	73-74-71-71=289	+1	80,500
T14	(United States) John Huston	77-69-72-71=289	+1	80,500
T14	(United States) Dennis Paulson	68-76-73-72=289	+1	80,500
T14	(United States) Chris Perry	73-75-72-69=289	+1	80,500
18	(United States) Jeff Sluman	73-69-77-71=290	+2	69,000
T19	(United States) Glen Day	79-67-74-71=291	+3	53,820
T19	(United States) Bob Estes	72-71-77-71=291	+3	53,820
T19	(Republic of Ireland) Pádraig Harrington	76-69-75-71=291	+3	53,820
T19	(Scotland) Colin Montgomerie	76-69-77-69=291	+3	53,820
T19	(United States) Steve Stricker	70-73-75-73=291	+3	53,820
T19	(France) Jean van de Velde	76-70-75-70=291	+3	53,820
T25	(United States) Steve Jones	71-70-76-75=292	+4	37,567
T25	(United States) Larry Mize (c)	78-67-73-74=292	+4	37,567
T25	(Australia) Craig Parry	75-71-72-74=292	+4	37,567
T28	(United States) Paul Azinger	72-72-77-72=293	+5	28,673
T28	(Denmark) Thomas Bjørn	71-77-73-72=293	+5	28,673
T28	(United States) Stewart Cink	75-72-72-74=293	+5	28,673
T28	(England) Nick Faldo (c)	72-72-74-75=293	+5	28,673
T28	(United States) Dudley Hart	75-71-72-75=293	+5	28,673
T28	(Germany) Bernhard Langer (c)	71-71-75-76=293	+5	28,673
T28	(United States) Justin Leonard	72-71-77-73=293	+5	28,673
T28	(Japan) Masashi Ozaki	72-72-74-75=293	+5	28,673
T28	(Canada) Mike Weir	75-70-70-78=293	+5	28,673
T37	(United States) Notah Begay III	74-74-73-73=294	+6	21,620
T37	(United States) Fred Funk	75-68-78-73=294	+6	21,620
T37	(United States) Jay Haas	75-71-75-73=294	+6	21,620
T40	(United States) Mark Brooks	72-76-73-74=295	+7	17,480
T40	(Northern Ireland) Darren Clarke	72-71-78-74=295	+7	17,480
T40	(Spain) Sergio García	70-72-75-78=295	+7	17,480
T40	(South Africa) Retief Goosen	73-69-79-74=295	+7	17,480
T40	(Sweden) Jesper Parnevik	77-71-70-77=295	+7	17,480
T40	(Wales) Ian Woosnam (c)	74-70-76-75=295	+7	17,480
T46	(United States) Scott Gump	75-70-78-73=296	+8	13,800
T46	(Japan) Shigeki Maruyama	76-71-74-75=296	+8	13,800
48	(United States) Brandt Jobe	73-74-76-74=297	+9	12,604
T49	(Spain) Miguel Ángel Jiménez	76-71-79-72=298	+10	11,623
T49	(United States) Steve Pate	78-69-77-74=298	+10	11,623
T49	(United States) David Toms	74-72-73-79=298	+10	11,623
T52	(Australia) Steve Elkington	74-74-78-73=299	+11	10,948
T52	(United States) Rocco Mediate	71-74-75-79=299	+11	10,948
T54	(United States) David Gossett (a)	75-71-79-78=303	+15	0
T54	(United States) Jack Nicklaus (c)	74-70-81-78=303	+15	10,672
56	(United States) Skip Kendall	76-72-77-83=308	+20	10,580
57	(United States) Tommy Aaron (c)	72-74-86-81=313	+25	10,488
CUT	(Australia) Aaron Baddeley (a)	77-72=149	+5	
CUT	(United States) Danny Green (a)	73-76=149	+5	
CUT	(United States) Scott Hoch	78-71=149	+5	
CUT	(United States) Jeff Maggert	77-72=149	+5	
CUT	(Spain) José María Olazábal (c)	72-77=149	+5	
CUT	(United States) Bob Tway	77-72=149	+5	
CUT	(United States) Duffy Waldorf	78-71=149	+5	
CUT	(Australia) Stuart Appleby	73-77=150	+6	
CUT	(Argentina) Ángel Cabrera	74-76=150	+6	
CUT	(United States) Brent Geiberger	76-74=150	+6	
CUT	(South Korea) Kim Sung-yoon (a)	75-75=150	+6	
CUT	(United States) Mark O'Meara (c)	75-75=150	+6	
CUT	(United States) Corey Pavin	80-70=150	+6	
CUT	(South Africa) Gary Player (c)	76-74=150	+6	
CUT	(United States) Craig Stadler (c)	73-77=150	+6	
CUT	(Sweden) Gabriel Hjertstedt	78-73=151	+7	
CUT	(Scotland) Sandy Lyle (c)	79-72=151	+7	
CUT	(United States) Tom Watson (c)	75-76=151	+7	
CUT	(United States) Lee Janzen	76-76=152	+8	
CUT	(Japan) Naomichi Ozaki	75-77=152	+8	
CUT	(England) Lee Westwood	77-75=152	+8	
CUT	(United States) John Daly	80-73=153	+9	
CUT	(United States) Hunter Haas (a)	80-73=153	+9	
CUT	(Scotland) Paul Lawrie	79-74=153	+9	
CUT	(United States) Charles Coody (c)	81-74=155	+11	
CUT	(United States) Ben Crenshaw (c)	79-76=155	+11	
CUT	(United States) Kirk Triplett	76-79=155	+11	
CUT	(United States) Ted Tryba	75-81=156	+12	
CUT	(United States) Fuzzy Zoeller (c)	82-74=156	+12	
CUT	(United States) Brian Watts	78-79=157	+13	
CUT	(United States) Raymond Floyd (c)	80-78=158	+14	
CUT	(United States) Tim Herron	84-74=158	+14	
CUT	(England) Graeme Storm (a)	83-76=159	+15	
CUT	(United States) Arnold Palmer (c)	78-82=160	+16	
CUT	(Spain) Seve Ballesteros (c)	81-81=162	+18	
CUT	(United States) Gay Brewer (c)	84-78=162	+18	
WD	(United States) Billy Casper (c)	84	+12	
WD	(United States) Doug Ford (c)	94	+22	

==== Scorecard ====
Hole	1	2	3	4	5	6	7	8	9	10	11	12	13	14	15	16	17	18
Par	4	5	4	3	4	3	4	5	4	4	4	3	5	4	5	3	4	4
(Fiji) Singh	−7	−7	−6	−6	−6	−7	−7	−8	−9	−9	−8	−8	−9	−9	−10	−9	−9	−10
(South Africa) Els	−3	−3	−3	−3	−3	−3	−3	−4	−4	−4	−5	−5	−6	−6	−7	−7	−7	−7
(United States) Duval	−4	−5	−5	−5	−5	−6	−6	−7	−8	−7	−7	−7	−6	−6	−7	−7	−7	−6
(United States) Roberts	−4	−4	−4	−4	−4	−4	−4	−5	−6	−5	−4	−4	−5	−6	−6	−6	−6	−6
(United States) Woods	−1	−2	−2	−3	−3	−2	−3	−4	−4	−4	−4	−4	−4	−4	−5	−4	−4	−4
(United States) Lehman	+1	E	E	E	−1	−1	E	E	E	E	E	−1	−2	−1	−1	−2	−2	−3
(Paraguay) Franco	E	E	E	E	E	E	E	E	−1	−1	−1	−1	−2	−1	−2	−2	−2	−2
(United States) Love	E	E	E	E	E	E	E	−1	−1	−1	−1	−1	−2	−2	−2	−2	−2	−2
(United States) Mickelson	−1	−2	−2	−2	−2	−2	−2	−2	−2	−1	−1	−2	−3	−2	−1	−1	−2	−2

Cumulative tournament scores, relative to par

Birdie	Bogey
