= James Lebbie =

Sierra Leone golfer

Personal information
- Full name: James Lebbie
- Nationality: Sierra Leone
- Born: 1957 or 1958 (age 67–68) British Sierra Leone

Career
- Sport: Golf
- Former tour: Challenge Tour
- Professional wins: 8

Number of wins by tour
- Challenge Tour: 1

James Lebbie is a professional golfer born in Sierra Leone.

== Career ==
Lebbie is a touring and teaching professional and a member of the Sierra Leone PGA. He is Sierra Leone's most successful professional golfer. He played in many tournaments on Europe's second tier Challenge Tour, mainly those held in Africa, recording a solitary victory in the 1992 Nigerian Open. He has also won the Sierra Leone Open many times.

Lebbie began playing golf at Freetown Golf Club in the beachside Freetown village of Lumley, and worked as the Head Professional there until the 1991 when the outbreak of the Sierra Leone Civil War caused Sierra Leone’s military to take over the golf course as a training base.

He has since moved to the United States to take up a position as a teaching professional at The Capital City Golf School, in Washington, D.C. As of 2016, Lebbie was working as a caddie at Congressional Country Club in Bethesda, Maryland.

== Professional wins (8) ==
=== Challenge Tour wins (1) ===
No.	Date	Tournament	Winning score	Margin of victory	Runner-up
1	15 Dec 1991 (1992 season)	Nigerian Open	−14 (67-66-66-71=270)	4 strokes	(England) Paul Eales

=== Other wins (7) ===
- 1980 Ghana Open
- 1985 Sierra Leone Open
- 1987 Sierra Leone Open
- 1988 Sierra Leone Open
- 1989 Sierra Leone Open
- 1990 Sierra Leone Open
- 2007 Bill Bishop tournament
