= Nigerian Open =

Golf tournament

Tournament information
- Location: Ikoyi, Lagos, Nigeria
- Established: 1969
- Course: Ikoyi Club
- Par: 71
- Tours: Challenge Tour; Safari Circuit
- Format: Stroke play
- Prize fund: £126,446
- Month played: February
- Final year: 1999

Tournament record score
- Aggregate: 255 Peter Tupling (1981)
- To par: −29 as above

Final champion
- (Sweden) Johan Sköld
- Location in Nigeria

The Nigerian Open was a golf tournament in Nigeria, played between 1969 and 1999. It was generally played at the Ikoyi Club in Ikoyi, Lagos. From 1997 to 1999 it was played at the IBB International Golf & Country Club in Abuja. It was an fixture on the Safari Circuit until 1993, and also a Challenge Tour event between 1990 and 1993.

In 1981, England's Peter Tupling set the record low 72 hole score in professional tournament golf, when he won the title with a 29 under par total of 255. Notable past champions include major winners Vijay Singh and Sandy Lyle and former Ryder Cup player Gordon J. Brand.

== Winners ==
Year	Tour (Note: CHA − Challenge Tour; SAF − Safari Circuit.)	Winner	Score	To par	Margin of victory	Runner(s)-up	Ref.
1999		(Sweden) Johan Sköld	278				
1998		(Argentina) José Cantero	274	−14			
1997		(Argentina) Ricardo González					
1995		(Nigeria) Lateef Lasisi					
1994		(Ghana) Emos Korblah	275				
1993	CHA	(Scotland) Gordon Manson	274	−10	2 strokes	(France) Frédéric Regard	
1992: No tournament due to rescheduling
1991	CHA	(Sierra Leone) James Lebbie	270	−14	4 strokes	(England) Paul Eales	
1990	CHA	(England) Wayne Stephens	198 (Note: Tournament contested over three rounds due to local elections.)	−15	6 strokes	(England) Chris Platts	
1989	SAF	(Fiji) Vijay Singh (2)	279	−5	1 stroke	(England) Gordon J. Brand (England) Jeff Pinsent (England) Ian Spencer	
1988	SAF	(Fiji) Vijay Singh	281	−3	Playoff (Note: Singh won with a par on the first hole of a sudden-death playoff.)	(Scotland) Mike Miller	
1987: No tournament
1986	SAF	(England) Gordon J. Brand	272	−12	8 strokes	(England) Malcolm MacKenzie	
1985	SAF	(Scotland) Bill Longmuir (3)	277	−3	2 strokes	(England) David Jagger	
1984	SAF	(Scotland) Ewen Murray	271	−13	1 stroke	(Scotland) Bill Longmuir	
1983	SAF	(England) Gordon J. Brand	275	−9	4 strokes	(England) Gary Cullen	
1982	SAF	(England) David Jagger (3)	274	−10	Playoff (Note: Jagger won with a birdie on the second hole of a sudden-death playoff.)	(Wales) Ian Woosnam	
1981	SAF	(England) Peter Tupling	255	−29	6 strokes	(Scotland) Bill Longmuir	
1980	SAF	(Scotland) Bill Longmuir (2)	264	−20	4 strokes	(England) Tommy Horton	
1979	SAF	(England) John Morgan	269	−15	5 strokes	(England) Pip Elson (England) Tommy Horton	
1978	SAF	(Scotland) Sandy Lyle	269	−15	Playoff (Note: Lyle won on the second hole of a sudden-death playoff.)	(England) Michael King	
1977	SAF	(England) David Jagger (2)	273	−11	Playoff (Note: Jagger won with a birdie on the second hole of a sudden-death playoff.)	(England) Malcolm Gregson	
1976		(Scotland) Bill Longmuir	209	−4	1 stroke	(England) Pip Elson (England) Carl Mason	
1975		(England) David Jagger	270	−14	Playoff (Note: Jagger won with a birdie on the second hole of a sudden-death playoff.)	(Scotland) Harry Bannerman (England) Peter Dawson	
1974		(Australia) Jack Newton	275	−9	4 strokes	(Republic of Ireland) Eamonn Darcy (Republic of Ireland) Christy O'Connor Jnr (Scotland) Ronnie Shade	
1973		(England) Tommy Horton	267	−17	3 strokes	(England) Malcolm Gregson	
1972: No tournament due to rescheduling
1971		(United States) Lee Elder	267	−17	5 strokes	(England) John Cook	
1970		(England) John Cook	276		1 stroke	(England) John Garner	
1969		(Scotland) Marshall Douglas	281		5 strokes	(England) Ian Wrigley	

== See also ==
- Open golf tournament
