= Ewen Murray =

Scottish golfer (born 1954)

Personal information
- Full name: James Ewen Murray
- Nationality: Scotland
- Born: 7 October 1954 (age 72) Edinburgh, Scotland

Career
- Sport: Golf
- Turned professional: 1971
- Professional wins: 3

Best results in major championships
- Masters Tournament: DNP
- PGA Championship: DNP
- U.S. Open: DNP
- The Open Championship: T31: 1973

James Ewen Murray (born 7 October 1954) is a retired Scottish professional golfer who played on the European Tour. He is now better known as a commentator for Sky Sports Golf channel.

He turned professional in 1971 after considerable success as a boy golfer. As a 15-year-old, Murray had reached the final of the 1970 Boys Amateur Championship and the following year won the World Junior Championship, the Scottish Boys Championship and the Scottish Boys Stroke Play Championship.

Murray won the 1977 Northern Open at Royal Dornoch, five ahead of the field. His best performances on the European Tour were two third places; in the 1979 SOS Talisman TPC and in the 1981 Bob Hope British Classic. He played regularly in Africa on the Safari Circuit, winning the Zambia Open in 1980 and the Nigerian Open in 1984, when he also topped the Order of Merit.

== Amateur wins ==
- 1971 World Junior Championship, Scottish Boys Championship, Scottish Boys Stroke Play Championship

== Professional wins (3) ==
=== Safari Circuit wins (2) ===
| No. | Date | Tournament | Winning score | Margin of victory | Runner-up |
|---|---|---|---|---|---|
| 1 | 30 Mar 1980 | Zambia Open | −10 (70-67-73-72=282) | 3 strokes | (Scotland) Brian Barnes |
| 2 | 26 Feb 1984 | Nigerian Open | −13 (67-70-64-70=271) | 1 stroke | (Scotland) Bill Longmuir |

=== Other wins (2) ===
- 1977 Northern Open

== Results in major championships ==
| Tournament | 1973 | 1974 | 1975 | 1976 | 1977 | 1978 | 1979 | 1980 | 1981 | 1982 | 1983 | 1984 |
|---|---|---|---|---|---|---|---|---|---|---|---|---|
| The Open Championship | T31 | | | | | 63 | CUT | | | | | T36 |

Note: Murray only played in The Open Championship.

Did not play

CUT = missed the half-way cut (3rd round cut in 1979 Open Championship)
"T" indicates a tie for a place
