= Sime Darby Harvard Championship =

Former golf tournament in Malaysia

Tournament information
- Location: Kedah, Malaysia
- Established: 2013
- Courses: Harvard Golf and Country Club
- Par: 72
- Length: 6,803 yards (6,221 m)
- Tours: Asian Development Tour; Professional Golf of Malaysia Tour
- Format: Stroke play
- Prize fund: RM180,000
- Month played: March
- Final year: 2016

Tournament record score
- Aggregate: 266 Wisut Artjanawat (2014)
- To par: −22 as above

Final champion
- (Malaysia) Shaaban Hussin
- Location in Malaysia

The Sime Darby Harvard Championship was a men's professional golf tournament held in Malaysia co-sanctioned by the Asian Development Tour and the Professional Golf of Malaysia Tour. The tournament was first played in 2013 as the Sime Darby Harvard Masters and the inaugural winner was James Bowen.

== Winners ==
Year	Tour(s) (Note: ADT − Asian Development Tour; PGM − Professional Golf of Malaysia Tour.)	Winner	Score	To par	Margin of victory	Runner(s)-up	Ref.
Sime Darby Harvard Championship
2016	PGM	(Malaysia) Shaaban Hussin	274	−14	2 strokes	(Malaysia) Iylia Jamil (Malaysia) Low Khai Jei	
2015	ADT, PGM	(Malaysia) Arie Irawan	270	−18	1 stroke	(Malaysia) Sukree Othman (New Zealand) Sean Riordan	
2014	ADT, PGM	(Thailand) Wisut Artjanawat	266	−22	1 stroke	(Malaysia) R. Nachimuthu	
Sime Darby Harvard Masters
2013	ADT, PGM	(United States) James Bowen	270	−18	4 strokes	(Canada) Lindsay Renolds (Thailand) Wasin Spipattranusorn (Thailand) Pavit Tangkamolprasert	
