= Selangor Masters =

PKNS Selangor Masters
Tournament information
- Location: Petaling Jaya, Malaysia
- Established: 2008
- Course: Seri Selangor Golf Club
- Par: 71
- Length: 6,922 yards (6,329 m)
- Tours: Asian Development Tour; Professional Golf of Malaysia Tour; Asian Tour
- Format: Stroke play
- Prize fund: US$175,000
- Month played: February

Tournament record score
- Aggregate: 268 Tawit Polthai (2025)
- To par: −16 Thaworn Wiratchant (2012) −16 Tawit Polthai (2025)

Current champion
- (Singapore) Nicklaus Chiam

Final champion
- Location in Malaysia

The Selangor Masters is a golf tournament on the Asian Development Tour, played in Malaysia. Originally an event on the Asian Tour, the inaugural tournament was held in 2008 at the Seri Selangor Golf Club and the prize fund was US$300,000. Malaysian native Ben Leong won the inaugural tournament. The 2014 prize fund was RM1,300,000.

== Winners ==
Year	Tour(s) (Note: ADT − Asian Development Tour; ASA − Asian Tour; PGM − Professional Golf of Malaysia Tour.)	Winner	Score	To par	Margin of victory	Runner(s)-up
PKNS Selangor Masters
2026	ADT, PGM	(Singapore) Nicklaus Chiam	274	−10	Playoff	(Malaysia) Khavish Varadan (Thailand) Runchanapong Youprayong
2025	ADT, PGM	(Thailand) Tawit Polthai	268	−16	3 strokes	(Philippines) Juvic Pagunsan
2024	ADT, PGM	(India) Rahil Gangjee	272	−8	1 stroke	(Australia) Deyen Lawson
2023	ADT, PGM	(Taiwan) Ho Yu-cheng	280	E	1 stroke	(Australia) Deyen Lawson (Thailand) Runchanapong Youprayong
2022	ADT, PGM	(Malaysia) Shahriffuddin Ariffin	275	−9	2 strokes	(Thailand) Denwit Boriboonsub
2015–2021: No tournament
Worldwide Holdings Selangor Masters
2014	ASA	(Thailand) Chapchai Nirat	274	−10	Playoff	(Philippines) Antonio Lascuña
2013	ASA	(Thailand) Pariya Junhasavasdikul	275	−9	1 stroke	(India) Anirban Lahiri
2012	ASA	(Thailand) Thaworn Wiratchant	272	−16	3 strokes	(India) Gaganjeet Bhullar
2011	ASA	(Finland) Joonas Granberg	273	−15	1 stroke	(Thailand) Panuphol Pittayarat
2010	ASA	(Philippines) Angelo Que	278	−6	Playoff	(England) Chris Rodgers
2009	ASA	(Australia) Rick Kulacz	273	−11	1 stroke	(Thailand) Kiradech Aphibarnrat
Worldwide Selangor Masters
2008	ASA	(Malaysia) Ben Leong	269	−15	1 stroke	(Thailand) Thongchai Jaidee
