= 2014 Asian Development Tour =

Golf tour season

2014 Asian Development Tour season
- Duration: 26 February 2014 – 6 December 2014
- Number of official events: 21
- Most wins: (Taiwan) Chan Shih-chang (3) (Thailand) Pavit Tangkamolprasert (3)
- Order of Merit: (Thailand) Pavit Tangkamolprasert

The 2014 Asian Development Tour was the fifth season of the Asian Development Tour, the official development tour to the Asian Tour.

== Schedule ==
The following table lists official events during the 2014 season.

Date	Tournament	Host country	Purse (US$)	Winner (Note: The number in brackets after each winner's name is the number of Asian Development Tour events they had won up to and including that tournament. It is rare for someone to accumulate many wins on the Asian Development Tour as success at this level usually leads to promotion to the Asian Tour.)	OWGR points	Other tours (Note: PGM − Professional Golf of Malaysia Tour; PGTI − Professional Golf Tour of India; PHI − Philippine Golf Tour; TWN − Taiwan PGA Tour.)
1 Mar	Sime Darby Harvard Championship	Malaysia	RM200,000	(Thailand) Wisut Artjanawat (1)	6	PGM
15 Mar	CCM Rahman Putra Championship	Malaysia	RM200,000	(United States) Brett Munson (1)	6	PGM
24 Apr	Lada Langkawi Championship	Malaysia	RM250,000	(Taiwan) Chan Shih-chang (2)	6	PGM
10 May	Northport Glenmarie Championship	Malaysia	RM200,000	(Malaysia) Danny Chia (2)	6	PGM
24 May	Johor Championship	Malaysia	RM200,000	(Taiwan) Chan Shih-chang (3)	6	PGM
31 May	ICTSI Riviera Classic	Philippines	60,000	(Philippines) Elmer Salvador (3)	6	PHI
7 Jun	ICTSI Orchard Championship	Philippines	60,000	(Philippines) Rufino Bayron (1)	6	PHI
14 Jun	Vascory Templer Park Championship	Malaysia	RM200,000	(Malaysia) Gavin Green (a) (1)	6	PGM
18 Jul	Linc Group Jakarta Classic	Indonesia	60,000	(Republic of Ireland) Niall Turner (1)	6	
27 Jul	Taifong Open	Taiwan	160,000	(Taiwan) Chan Shih-chang (4) (Note: Chan earned immediate promotion to the Asian Tour, as this was his third win of the season.)	6	TWN
3 Aug	Ballantine's Taiwan Championship	Taiwan	110,000	(Taiwan) Lin Wen-tang (2)	6	TWN
17 Aug	Terengganu Championship	Malaysia	RM200,000	(Thailand) Pavit Tangkamolprasert (2)	6	PGM
24 Aug	Ciputra Golfpreneur Tournament	Indonesia	100,000	(Scotland) James Byrne (2)	6	
30 Aug	Aboitiz Invitational	Philippines	100,000	(Philippines) Antonio Lascuña (1)	6	PHI
6 Sep	Sabah Championship	Malaysia	RM250,000	(Thailand) Sattaya Supupramai (1)	6	PGM
13 Sep	MNRB Sarawak Championship	Malaysia	RM250,000	(Thailand) Pavit Tangkamolprasert (3)	6	PGM
27 Sep	Port Dickson Championship	Malaysia	RM200,000	(Canada) Ryan Yip (1)	6	PGM
19 Oct	ADT Chang Hwa Open	Taiwan	100,000	(Thailand) Pavit Tangkamolprasert (4) (Note: Tangkamolprasert earned immediate promotion to the Asian Tour, as this was his third win of the season.)	6	TWN
1 Nov	TAKE Solutions India Masters	India	70,000	(India) S. Chikkarangappa (1)	6	PGTI
8 Nov	UMW Impian Championship	Malaysia	RM200,000	(Thailand) Sattaya Supupramai (2)	6	PGM
6 Dec	MIDF KLGCC Masters	Malaysia	RM250,000	(Malaysia) Rizal Amin (1)	6	PGM

== Order of Merit ==
The Order of Merit was based on prize money won during the season, calculated in U.S. dollars. The top five players on the Order of Merit (not otherwise exempt) earned status to play on the 2015 Asian Tour.

Position	Player	Prize money ($)
1	(Thailand) Pavit Tangkamolprasert	68,975
2	(Taiwan) Chan Shih-chang	68,723
3	(Republic of Ireland) Niall Turner	46,219
4	(Thailand) Sattaya Supupramai	46,193
5	(United States) Brett Munson	44,332
6	(Malaysia) Arie Irawan	37,276
