= 2020–22 Professional Golf of Malaysia Tour =

Golf tour season

2020–22 Professional Golf of Malaysia Tour season
- Duration: 23 September 2020 – 8 December 2022
- Number of official events: 12
- Most wins: (Malaysia) Shahriffuddin Ariffin (4)
- Order of Merit: (Malaysia) Shahriffuddin Ariffin

The 2020–22 Professional Golf of Malaysia Tour was the 10th season of the Professional Golf of Malaysia Tour, the main professional golf tour in Malaysia since it was formed in 2010.

== Schedule ==
The following table lists official events during the 2020–22 season.

Date	Tournament	Location	Purse (RM)	Winner (Note: The number in brackets after each winner's name is the number of Professional Golf of Malaysia Tour events they had won up to and including that tournament.)	OWGR points	Other tours (Note: ADT − Asian Development Tour.)
26 Sep 2020	MNRB Championship	Selangor	200,000	(Malaysia) Gavin Green (5)	n/a	
26 Feb 2022	Tun Ahmad Sarji Trophy	Selangor	200,000	(Malaysia) Gavin Green (6)	n/a	
24 Mar 2022	Maybank Championship	Selangor	120,000	(Malaysia) Shahriffuddin Ariffin (3)	n/a	
26 May 2022	Kia Championship	Selangor	120,000	(Malaysia) Shahriffuddin Ariffin (4)	n/a	
23 Jun 2022	Port Dickson Championship	Negeri Sembilan	120,000	(Malaysia) Shahriffuddin Ariffin (5)	n/a	
21 Jul 2022	Pahang Championship	Pahang	120,000	(Malaysia) Nicholas Fung (17)	n/a	
25 Aug 2022	MNRB Championship	Selangor	120,000	(Malaysia) Kim Leun Kwang (2)	n/a	
22 Sep 2022	UMW Championship	Selangor	120,000	(Malaysia) Wilson Choo (4)	n/a	
13 Oct 2022	Northport Championship	Selangor	120,000	(Malaysia) Paul San (1)	n/a	
3 Nov 2022	Tiara Melaka Championship	Melaka	120,000	(Malaysia) Nicholas Fung (18)	n/a	
26 Nov 2022	PKNS Selangor Masters	Selangor	US$150,000	(Malaysia) Shahriffuddin Ariffin (6)	0.92	ADT
8 Dec 2022	Danau Championship	Negeri Sembilan	120,000	(Malaysia) Nicholas Fung (19)	n/a	

== Order of Merit ==
The Order of Merit was based on prize money won during the season, calculated in Malaysian ringgit.

Position	Player	Prize money (RM)
1	(Malaysia) Shahriffuddin Ariffin	217,622
2	(Malaysia) Nicholas Fung	91,080
3	(Malaysia) Danny Chia	80,108
4	(Malaysia) Sukree Othman	74,482
5	(Malaysia) Gavin Green	66,500
