= 2014 Professional Golf of Malaysia Tour =

Golf tour season

2014 Professional Golf of Malaysia Tour season
- Duration: 13 January 2014 – 13 December 2014
- Number of official events: 25
- Most wins: (Malaysia) R. Nachimuthu (2) (Note: Chan Shih-chang, Sattaya Supupramai and Pavit Tangkamolprasert also won two events, but were not Professional Golf of Malaysia Tour members.) (Malaysia) Airil Rizman (2)
- Order of Merit: (Malaysia) Airil Rizman

The 2014 Professional Golf of Malaysia Tour was the fourth season of the Professional Golf of Malaysia Tour, the main professional golf tour in Malaysia since it was formed in 2010.

== Schedule ==
The following table lists official events during the 2014 season.

Date	Tournament	Location	Purse (RM)	Winner (Note: The number in brackets after each winner's name is the number of Professional Golf of Malaysia Tour events they had won up to and including that tournament.)	OWGR points	Other tours (Note: ADT − Asian Development Tour; ASEAN − ASEAN PGA Tour.)
16 Jan	I&P Tournament of Champions	Selangor	200,000	(Malaysia) Kemarol Baharin (1)	n/a	
15 Feb	Swiss Garden Championship	Perak	160,000	(Malaysia) Hans Jamil (1)	n/a	
1 Mar	Sime Darby Harvard Championship	Kedah	200,000	(Thailand) Wisut Artjanawat (n/a)	6	ADT
8 Mar	Kelantan Championship	Kelantan	160,000	(Malaysia) Nicholas Fung (9)	n/a	
15 Mar	CCM Rahman Putra Championship	Selangor	200,000	(United States) Brett Munson (n/a)	6	ADT
20 Mar	Kinrara Championship	Selangor	160,000	(Malaysia) R. Nachimuthu (6) (Malaysia) S. Siva Chandhran (3)	n/a	
12 Apr	Impian Championship	Selangor	160,000	(Malaysia) R. Nachimuthu (7)	n/a	
24 Apr	Lada Langkawi Championship	Kedah	250,000	(Taiwan) Chan Shih-chang (n/a)	6	ADT
10 May	Northport Glenmarie Championship	Selangor	200,000	(Malaysia) Danny Chia (5)	6	ADT
24 May	Johor Championship	Johor	200,000	(Taiwan) Chan Shih-chang (n/a)	6	ADT
31 May	Melaka Championship	Melaka	170,000	(Thailand) Gunn Charoenkul (n/a)	n/a	ASEAN
14 Jun	Vascory Templer Park Championship	Selangor	200,000	(Malaysia) Gavin Green (a) (1)	6	ADT
21 Jun	Perlis Championship	Perlis	170,000	(Malaysia) Airil Rizman (4)	n/a	
9 Aug	Penang Championship	Penang	170,000	(Philippines) Jhonnel Ababa (n/a)	n/a	ASEAN
17 Aug	Terengganu Championship	Terengganu	200,000	(Thailand) Pavit Tangkamolprasert (n/a)	6	ADT
23 Aug	I&P Group Championship	Selangor	170,000	(Malaysia) Ben Leong (1)	n/a	
6 Sep	Sabah Championship	Sabah	250,000	(Thailand) Sattaya Supupramai (n/a)	6	ADT
13 Sep	MNRB Sarawak Championship	Sarawak	250,000	(Thailand) Pavit Tangkamolprasert (n/a)	6	ADT
27 Sep	Port Dickson Championship I	Pahang	200,000	(Canada) Ryan Yip (n/a)	6	ADT
11 Oct	Orna Melaka Championship	Selangor	160,000	(Malaysia) Shaaban Hussin (3)	n/a	
18 Oct	Port Dickson Championship II	Pahang	170,000	(Malaysia) Lim Eng Seng (1)	n/a	ASEAN
8 Nov	UMW Impian Championship	Selangor	200,000	(Thailand) Sattaya Supupramai (n/a)	6	ADT
29 Nov	Tiara Championship	Melaka	180,000	(Malaysia) Airil Rizman (5)	n/a	
6 Dec	MIDF KLGCC Masters	Selangor	250,000	(Malaysia) Rizal Amin (1)	6	ADT
13 Dec	Maybank Players Championship	Melaka	350,000	(Malaysia) Arie Irawan (1)	n/a	

== Order of Merit ==
The Order of Merit was based on prize money won during the season, calculated in Malaysian ringgit.

Position	Player	Prize money (RM)
1	(Malaysia) Airil Rizman	178,922
2	(Malaysia) R. Nachimuthu	169,149
3	(Malaysia) Shaaban Hussin	118,982
4	(Malaysia) Rizal Amin	110,785
5	(Malaysia) Khor Kheng Hwai	105,950
