= Iain Steel =

Malaysian professional golfer (born 1971)

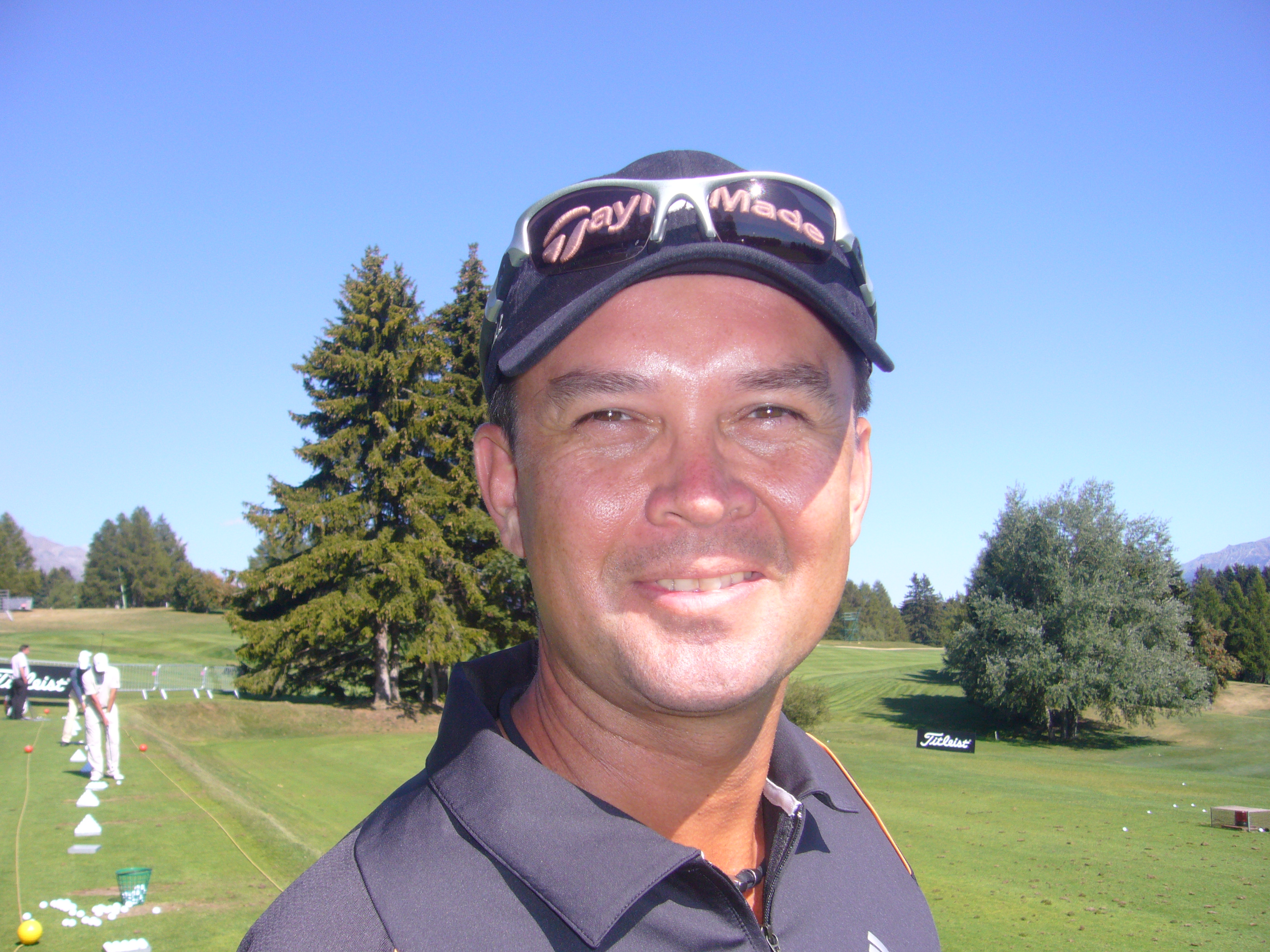
- Steel at the 2009 Omega European Masters

Personal information
- Nationality: Malaysia
- Born: 3 May 1971 (age 55) Sabah, Malaysia
- Height: 1.76 m (5 ft 9 in)
- Weight: 86 kg (190 lb; 13.5 st)

Career
- Sport: Golf
- College: Auburn University
- Turned professional: 1996
- Former tours: PGA Tour; Asian Tour; Nike Tour; Challenge Tour; Asian Development Tour; Canadian Tour; Professional Golf of Malaysia Tour
- Professional wins: 6

Number of wins by tour
- Korn Ferry Tour: 1
- Other: 5

Best results in major championships
- Masters Tournament: DNP
- PGA Championship: DNP
- U.S. Open: DNP
- The Open Championship: CUT: 1996

Iain Steel (born 3 May 1971) is a Malaysian professional golfer.

== Career ==
Steel was born in Sabah, Malaysia to a Scottish father and Malaysian mother. He went to Auburn University in the United States and turned professional in 1996. That year, he became the first Malaysian golfer ever to play in The Open Championship.

Steel played on the second-tier Nike Tour in 1997, before progressing to the PGA Tour in 1998 after graduating from the Qualifying Tournament. His rookie season on the PGA Tour brought little success and he returned to the Nike Tour for 1999. He made few cuts in three more seasons on that tour before he lost his playing rights for 2002. He returned in 2003 after a season on the Canadian Tour but continued to struggle, before trying to qualify for the European Tour at the end of 2004. He reached the final stage of qualifying school to earn a limited card for Europe's second tier Challenge Tour for 2005. Although he had two top ten finishes, he made little impact and was unable to retain his card.

Steel joined the Asian Tour in 2006 after finishing tied for 4th place at the tour qualifying school. He has since managed to establish himself on the tour, appearing inside the top 50 on the Order of Merit each season with a number of strong finishes, although he has yet to win a tournament. While he plays predominantly in Asia, he has retained membership of the European Tour, so is also shown on that tour's money list courtesy of his appearances in tournaments co-sanctioned by both tours.

Steel played on the Asian Tour until a back injury cost him his Tour card in 2011 and he limped through 2012 making one cut in nine events. He was part of the Asian Development Tour for 2013, won twice, placed third on the ADT Order of Merit, and regained his Asian Tour card.

== Professional wins (6) ==
=== Nike Tour wins (1) ===
| No. | Date | Tournament | Winning score | Margin of victory | Runner-up |
|---|---|---|---|---|---|
| 1 | 21 Sep 1997 | Nike Boise Open | −17 (67-66-66-68=267) | 3 strokes | (United States) Carl Paulson |

=== Asian Development Tour wins (2) ===
| No. | Date | Tournament | Winning score | Margin of victory | Runner-up |
|---|---|---|---|---|---|
| 1 | 11 Aug 2013 | Ballantine's Taiwan Championship^{1} | −11 (73-70-70-64=277) | 1 stroke | (Australia) Daniel Bringolf |
| 2 | 24 Aug 2013 | Terengganu Masters^{2} | −13 (70-68-70-63=271) | 1 stroke | (Indonesia) Rory Hie |

^{1}Co-sanctioned by the Taiwan PGA Tour
^{2}Co-sanctioned by the Professional Golf of Malaysia Tour

=== Canadian Tour wins (1) ===
| No. | Date | Tournament | Winning score | Margin of victory | Runner-up |
|---|---|---|---|---|---|
| 1 | 30 Jun 2002 | Greater Vancouver Classic | −16 (66-67-75-64=272) | Playoff | (United States) Ken Duke |

=== Professional Golf of Malaysia Tour wins (1) ===
| No. | Date | Tournament | Winning score | Margin of victory | Runner-up |
|---|---|---|---|---|---|
| 1 | 24 Aug 2013 | Terengganu Masters^{1} | −13 (70-68-70-63=271) | 1 stroke | (Indonesia) Rory Hie |

^{1}Co-sanctioned by the Asian Development Tour

=== Other wins (2) ===
- 2001 Alabama Open
- 2006 Malaysian PGA Championship

== Playoff record ==
Asian Tour playoff record (0–1)

| No. | Year | Tournament | Opponent | Result |
|---|---|---|---|---|
| 1 | 2007 | Clariden Leu Singapore Masters | (China) Liang Wenchong | Lost to par on first extra hole |

== Results in major championships ==
| Tournament | 1996 |
|---|---|
| The Open Championship | CUT |

Note: Steel only played in The Open Championship.
CUT = missed the half-way cut

== See also ==
- 1997 PGA Tour Qualifying School graduates
