= 2011 Professional Golf of Malaysia Tour =

Golf tour season

2011 Professional Golf of Malaysia Tour season
- Duration: 27 December 2010 – 22 December 2011
- Number of official events: 16
- Most wins: (Malaysia) Danny Chia (2) (Malaysia) Nicholas Fung (2) (Malaysia) Rashid Ismail (2) (Malaysia) R. Nachimuthu (2)
- Order of Merit: (Malaysia) R. Nachimuthu

The 2011 Professional Golf of Malaysia Tour was the inaugural season of the Professional Golf of Malaysia Tour, the main professional golf tour in Malaysia since it was formed in 2010.

== Schedule ==
The following table lists official events during the 2011 season.

Date	Tournament	Location	Purse (RM)	Winner (Note: The number in brackets after each winner's name is the number of Professional Golf of Malaysia Tour events they had won up to and including that tournament.)	Other tours (Note: ADT − Asian Development Tour.)
30 Dec	Impian Masters	Selangor	150,000	(Malaysia) Danny Chia (1)	
27 Jan	Terengganu Classic	Terengganu	125,000	(Malaysia) Shaaban Hussain (1)	
26 Feb	Kelantan Classic	Kelantan	125,000	(Malaysia) Kemarol Baharin (1)	
24 Mar	Kinrara Classic	Selangor	125,000	(Malaysia) Iylia Jamil (1)	
21 Apr	Harvard Classic	Kedah	125,000	(Malaysia) Sukree Othman (1)	
8 May	CCM Impian Classic	Selangor	200,000	(United States) Jonathan Moore (n/a)	ADT
26 May	Penang Classic	Penang	125,000	(Malaysia) R. Nachimuthu (1)	
12 Jun	Melaka Classic	Melaka	180,000	(Malaysia) S. Siva Chandhran (1)	ADT
23 Jun	Clearwater Classic	Perak	150,000	(Malaysia) Danny Chia (2)	
14 Jul	Johor Classic	Johor	150,000	(Malaysia) Rashid Ismail (1)	
28 Jul	Sabah Classic	Sabah	200,000	(Malaysia) Nicholas Fung (1)	
8 Sep	Sarawak Classic	Sarawak	250,000	(Malaysia) Nicholas Fung (2)	
25 Sep	MIDF KLGCC Classic	Selangor	200,000	(Netherlands) Guido van der Valk (n/a)	ADT
20 Oct	Lanjut Classic	Pahang	125,000	(Malaysia) S. Murthy (1)	
24 Nov	Seremban Classic	Negeri Sembilan	125,000	(Malaysia) Rashid Ismail (2)	
22 Dec	Kinrara Masters	Selangor	300,000	(Malaysia) R. Nachimuthu (2)	

== Order of Merit ==
The Order of Merit was based on prize money won during the season, calculated in Malaysian ringgit.

Position	Player	Prize money (RM)
1	(Malaysia) R. Nachimuthu	159,167
2	(Malaysia) Rashid Ismail	144,721
3	(Malaysia) Nicholas Fung	121,377
