= 2013 Professional Golf of Malaysia Tour =

Golf tour season

2013 Professional Golf of Malaysia Tour season
- Duration: 3 January 2013 – 14 December 2013
- Number of official events: 22
- Most wins: (Malaysia) Nicholas Fung (4)
- Order of Merit: (Malaysia) Nicholas Fung

The 2013 Professional Golf of Malaysia Tour was the third season of the Professional Golf of Malaysia Tour, the main professional golf tour in Malaysia since it was formed in 2010.

== Schedule ==
The following table lists official events during the 2013 season.

Date	Tournament	Location	Purse (RM)	Winner (Note: The number in brackets after each winner's name is the number of Professional Golf of Malaysia Tour events they had won up to and including that tournament.)	OWGR points	Other tours (Note: ADT − Asian Development Tour; ASEAN − ASEAN PGA Tour.)
6 Jan	I&P Kinrara Classic	Selangor	150,000	(Malaysia) Danny Chia (3)	n/a	
2 Feb	CCM Rahman Putra Masters	Selangor	200,000	(Scotland) James Byrne (n/a)	6	ADT
23 Feb	Sime Darby Harvard Masters	Kedah	200,000	(United States) James Bowen (n/a)	6	ADT
9 Mar	Northport Glenmarie Masters	Selangor	200,000	(Malaysia) Danny Chia (4)	6	ADT
17 Mar	Clearwater Classic	Perak	150,000	(Malaysia) Anis Helmi Hassan (1)	n/a	
13 Apr	Maybank Johor Masters	Johor	200,000	(England) Grant Jackson (n/a)	6	ADT
28 Apr	LADA Langkawi Masters	Kedah	200,000	(Japan) Mitsuhiko Hashizume (n/a)	6	ADT
11 May	A'Famosa Masters	Melaka	180,000	(Singapore) Mardan Mamat (n/a)	n/a	ASEAN
30 May	Kelantan Classic	Kelantan	150,000	(Malaysia) S. Siva Chandhran (2)	n/a	
15 Jun	Penang Classic	Penang	180,000	(Malaysia) Shaaban Hussin (2)	n/a	ASEAN
29 Jun	UMW Templer Park Masters	Selangor	200,000	(Malaysia) Nicholas Fung (5)	6	ADT
6 Jul	Perlis Classic	Perlis	150,000	(Malaysia) Sukree Othman (5)	n/a	
18 Aug	I&P Group Championship	Selangor	150,000	(Malaysia) Nicholas Fung (6)	n/a	
24 Aug	Terengganu Masters	Terengganu	200,000	(Malaysia) Iain Steel (1)	6	ADT
7 Sep	UMW Sabah Classic	Sabah	180,000	(Taiwan) Chan Shih-chang (n/a)	6	ADT
28 Sep	Melaka Classic	Melaka	180,000	(Malaysia) Nicholas Fung (7)	n/a	
6 Oct	MNRB Sarawak Masters	Sarawak	200,000	(Thailand) Jakraphan Premsirigorn (n/a)	6	ADT
20 Oct	Pahang Classic	Pahang	150,000	(Malaysia) Wilson Choo (1)	n/a	
26 Oct	Negeri Sembilan Masters	Negeri Sembilan	180,000	(Thailand) Kwanchai Tannin (n/a)	n/a	ASEAN
10 Nov	MIDF KLGCC Masters	Selangor	200,000	(Japan) Masaru Takahashi (n/a)	6	ADT
23 Nov	Impian Classic	Selangor	150,000	(Malaysia) Nicholas Fung (8)	n/a	
14 Dec	Maybank Players Championship	Selangor	350,000	(Malaysia) R. Nachimuthu (5)	n/a	

== Order of Merit ==
The Order of Merit was based on prize money won during the season, calculated in Malaysian ringgit.

Position	Player	Prize money (RM)
1	(Malaysia) Nicholas Fung	221,311
2	(Malaysia) R. Nachimuthu	178,358
3	(Malaysia) Airil Rizman	140,683
4	(Malaysia) Shaaban Hussin	118,581
5	(Malaysia) Sukree Othman	114,737
