= Gavin Green =

Malaysian professional golfer (born 1993)

Personal information
- Full name: Gavin Kyle Gabriel Green
- Nationality: Malaysia
- Born: 28 December 1993 (age 32) Kuala Lumpur, Malaysia
- Height: 6 ft 1 in (185 cm)
- Weight: 190 lb (86 kg)

Career
- Sport: Golf
- College: University of New Mexico
- Turned professional: 2015
- Current tours: European Tour; Challenge Tour
- Former tours: Asian Tour; Asian Development Tour; Professional Golf of Malaysia Tour
- Professional wins: 10

Number of wins by tour
- Asian Tour: 1
- Other: 9

Best results in major championships
- Masters Tournament: DNP
- PGA Championship: DNP
- U.S. Open: DNP
- The Open Championship: T61: 2018

Achievements and awards
- Asian Tour Order of Merit winner: 2017
- Asian Tour Players' Player of the Year: 2017
Medal record
Southeast Asian Games
Silver medal – second place	2013 Myanmar	Individual
Bronze medal – third place	2013 Myanmar	Men's team

Gavin Kyle Gabriel Green (born 28 December 1993) is a Malaysian professional golfer.

== Amateur career ==
Green played college golf at the University of New Mexico where he won eight times and was a 3-time All-American (3rd team 2013, 2nd team 2014, 1st team 2015) and 2-time Mountain West Conference golfer of the year.

== Professional career ==
Green won three times on the Asian Development Tour, once in 2014 as an amateur and twice in 2016. He qualified for the 2016 Summer Olympics and finished in 47th place, the 2020 Summer Olympics (tying for 57th place), and the 2024 Summer Olympics (tying for 33rd place).

Green played on the Asian Tour in 2017. He was runner-up in the Hero Indian Open, the Yeangder Heritage and the Shinhan Donghae Open before winning the Mercuries Taiwan Masters and leading the Order of Merit.

== Personal life ==
Green is of Portuguese, Irish and Chinese descent. His parents are Gary and Vivienne Green. His brother Galven Green played college golf at the University of New Mexico, where he also won the Mountain West Conference individual championship in 2019.

== Amateur wins ==
- 2009 Perlis Amateur, Malaysian Amateur Closed, Kurnia Saujana Amateur, TSM Golf Challenge, Malaysian Junior Open
- 2010 Malaysian Amateur Closed, TSM Golf Challenge, Sabah International Junior Masters
- 2011 Kuala Lumpur Amateur, Malaysian Amateur Closed, Kurnia Saujana Championship
- 2012 Malaysian Amateur Open, Saujana Championship, William H Tucker
- 2013 Putra Cup, William H Tucker, Western Refining College All-American
- 2014 UTSA Lone Star Invitational, Mountain West Championship, William H Tucker, Western Refining College All-American
- 2015 Hootie at Bulls Bay Invitational

== Professional wins (10) ==
=== Asian Tour wins (1) ===
No.	Date	Tournament	Winning score	Margin of victory	Runners-up
1	1 Oct 2017	Mercuries Taiwan Masters^{1}	−9 (67-70-70-71=279)	2 strokes	(Brazil) Adilson da Silva, (South Africa) Keith Horne, (Philippines) Juvic Pagunsan, (Zimbabwe) Scott Vincent

^{1}Co-sanctioned by the Taiwan PGA Tour

=== Asian Development Tour wins (3) ===
No.	Date	Tournament	Winning score	Margin of victory	Runner-up
1	14 Jun 2014	Vascory Templer Park Championship^{1} (as an amateur)	−26 (67-64-67-64=262)	11 strokes	(Malaysia) Airil Rizman
2	27 Feb 2016	Northport Glenmarie Championship^{1}	−19 (65-71-66-67=269)	2 strokes	(India) S. Chikkarangappa
3	16 Apr 2016	ICTSI Manila Southwoods Championship^{2}	−16 (66-65-72-65=268)	2 strokes	(Singapore) Deng Shan Koh

^{1}Co-sanctioned by the Professional Golf of Malaysia Tour
^{2}Co-sanctioned by the Philippine Golf Tour

=== Professional Golf of Malaysia Tour wins (8) ===
No.	Date	Tournament	Winning score	Margin of victory	Runner(s)-up
1	14 Jun 2014	Vascory Templer Park Championship^{1} (as an amateur)	−26 (67-64-67-64=262)	11 strokes	(Malaysia) Airil Rizman
2	31 Oct 2015	Danau Championship II	−12 (74-67-68-67=276)	4 strokes	(Malaysia) Shaaban Hussin
3	27 Feb 2016	Northport Glenmarie Championship^{1}	−19 (65-71-66-67=269)	2 strokes	(India) S. Chikkarangappa
4	21 Sep 2016	SapuraKencana National Classic	−4 (68-73-71=212)	Playoff	(Malaysia) Ben Leong
5	26 Sep 2020	MNRB Championship	−13 (71-70-70-64=275)	4 strokes	(Malaysia) Sukree Othman
6	26 Feb 2022	Tun Ahmad Sarji Trophy	−13 (71-69-67-68=275)	1 stroke	(Malaysia) Danny Chia
7	10 Aug 2023	Corolla Cross Cup	−16 (67-66-67=200)	5 strokes	(Malaysia) Nicholas Fung, (Malaysia) Paul San
8	23 Apr 2026	Tun Ahmad Sarji Trophy (2)	−14 (63-71-68=202)	6 strokes	(Malaysia) Anson Yeo (a)

^{1}Co-sanctioned by the Asian Development Tour

== Results in major championships ==
Tournament	2018
Masters Tournament	
U.S. Open	
The Open Championship	T61
PGA Championship	

Did not play

"T" indicates a tie for a place

== Results in World Golf Championships ==
Tournament	2017	2018
Championship		64
Match Play		
Invitational		
Champions	T38	

Did not play

"T" = Tied

== Team appearances ==
Amateur

- Eisenhower Trophy (representing Malaysia): 2012, 2014

Professional

- EurAsia Cup (representing Asia): 2018
- World Cup (representing Malaysia): 2018
