= 2018 Asian Development Tour =

Golf tour season

2018 Asian Development Tour season
- Duration: 24 January 2018 – 1 December 2018
- Number of official events: 22
- Most wins: (Thailand) Varanyu Rattanaphiboonkij (2)
- Order of Merit: (Argentina) Miguel Ángel Carballo

The 2018 Asian Development Tour was the ninth season of the Asian Development Tour, the official development tour to the Asian Tour.

== Schedule ==
The following table lists official events during the 2018 season.

Date	Tournament	Host country	Purse (US$)	Winner (Note: The number in brackets after each winner's name is the number of Asian Development Tour events they had won up to and including that tournament. It is rare for someone to accumulate many wins on the Asian Development Tour as success at this level usually leads to promotion to the Asian Tour.)	OWGR points	Other tours (Note: ATGT − All Thailand Golf Tour; PGM − Professional Golf of Malaysia Tour; PGTI − Professional Golf Tour of India; PTINA − PGA Tour of Indonesia; TWN − Taiwan PGA Tour.)
27 Jan	Darulaman Championship	Malaysia	RM225,000	(United States) Kurt Kitayama (1)	6	PGM
27 Jan	City Bank American Express Dhaka Open	Bangladesh	৳5,000,000	(Bangladesh) Siddikur Rahman (2)	n/a	PGTI
10 Mar	Richard Mille Brunei Championships	Brunei	60,000	(Thailand) Kiradech Aphibarnrat (3)	10	
24 Mar	OB Golf Invitational	Indonesia	70,000	(Japan) Shohei Hasegawa (1)	6	PTINA
7 Apr	Johor Championship II	Malaysia	RM225,000	(Singapore) Johnson Poh (1)	6	PGM
27 Apr	BTI Open	Bangladesh	60,000	(Japan) Kazuki Higa (1)	6	PGTI
5 May	Penang Championship	Malaysia	RM225,000	(Thailand) Nitithorn Thippong (1)	6	PGM
13 May	Singha Laguna Phuket Open	Thailand	฿2,000,000	(Thailand) Varanyu Rattanaphiboonkij (1)	6	ATGT
27 May	Betagro Championship	Thailand	฿3,000,000	(Thailand) Pavit Tangkamolprasert (6)	7	ATGT
28 Jul	Northport Championship	Malaysia	RM225,000	(United States) Josh Salah (2)	6	PGM
3 Aug	Louis Philippe Cup	India	75,000	(India) Rahil Gangjee (1)	6	PGTI
11 Aug	Sabah Championship	Malaysia	RM225,000	(Malaysia) Ben Leong (2)	6	PGM
18 Aug	Labuan Championship	Malaysia	RM225,000	(Malaysia) Shahriffuddin Ariffin (1)	6	PGM
19 Aug	Taifong Open	Taiwan	160,000	(Taiwan) Chan Shih-chang (6)	6	TWN
25 Aug	Ciputra Golfpreneur Tournament	Indonesia	110,000	(Argentina) Miguel Ángel Carballo (1)	6	PTINA
8 Sep	Miri Championship	Malaysia	RM225,000	(Bangladesh) Shakhawat Sohel (1)	6	PGM
15 Sep	MNRB Championship	Malaysia	RM225,000	(Japan) Yutaka Araki (1)	6	PGM
6 Oct	UMW Championship	Malaysia	RM225,000	(South Africa) Mathiam Keyser (3)	6	PGM
13 Oct	CCM Championship	Malaysia	RM225,000	(United States) Han Lee (1)	6	PGM
20 Oct	MIDF Championship	Malaysia	RM225,000	(United States) Sam Gillis (1)	6	PGM
9 Nov	Combiphar Players Championship	Indonesia	110,000	(Thailand) Varanyu Rattanaphiboonkij (2)	6	PTINA
1 Dec	Maybank Championship	Malaysia	RM225,000	(Japan) Shinichi Mizuno (1)	6	PGM

== Order of Merit ==
The Order of Merit was based on prize money won during the season, calculated in U.S. dollars. The top seven players on the Order of Merit earned status to play on the 2019 Asian Tour.

Position	Player	Prize money ($)
1	(Argentina) Miguel Ángel Carballo	43,379
2	(Thailand) Nitithorn Thippong	37,579
3	(Thailand) Varanyu Rattanphiboonkij	34,031
4	(United States) Han Lee	31,156
5	(Finland) Janne Kaske	30,678
6	(South Africa) Mathiam Keyser	29,934
7	(Japan) Shinichi Mizuno	28,308
