= Arie Irawan =

Malaysian professional golfer (1990–2019)

Personal information
- Full name: Muhammad Arie Irawan Ahmad Fauzi
- Nationality: Malaysia
- Born: 21 August 1990 Selangor, Malaysia
- Died: 7 April 2019 (aged 28) Sanya, China
- Height: 6 ft 1 in (1.85 m)

Career
- Sport: Golf
- College: University of Tulsa
- Turned professional: 2013
- Former tours: Asian Tour; Asian Development Tour; PGA Tour China; Professional Golf of Malaysia Tour
- Professional wins: 4

Muhammad Arie Irawan Ahmad Fauzi (21 August 1990 – 7 April 2019) was a Malaysian professional golfer who played on the Asian Tour, the Asian Development Tour and the PGA Tour China. He won two events on the Asian Development Tour in early 2015.

== Amateur career ==
Irawan won the 2008 Malaysian Amateur Stroke Play Championship. He attended the University of Tulsa from 2008 to 2012. In 2012 he won the Negeri Sembilan Amateur Open.

== Professional career ==
Irawan interviewed during Maybank Malaysian Open 2013

Irawan turned professional in April 2013. For the 2014 season he played on the Asian Development Tour and earned his tour card for the 2015 Asian Tour after a 6th-place finish on the Asian Development Tour's Order of Merit. Another player within the top five also placed within the top 60 on the Asian Tour Order of Merit, allowing Irawan to earn his Tour card.

In January 2015 Irawan won his first Official World Golf Ranking points event at the PGM Sime Darby Harvard Championship on the Asian Development Tour, becoming the highest ranked Malaysian golfer in the world rankings. In April 2015 he won his second Asian Development Tour event, the ICTSI Eagle Ridge Invitational, in the Philippines, a result that lifted him into the top 300 in the world rankings. He was 7th in the 2015 Asian Development Tour Order of Merit.

Irawan was involved in a moped accident in early 2016 and missed much of the season. In 2018 and 2019 Irawan also played on the PGA Tour China.

After his successes in early 2015 his best finishes in world ranking events were to be twice tied for fourth place, in the 2018 PGM Johor Championship on the Asian Development Tour and in the 2018 Guilin Championship on the PGA Tour China.

In addition to his two Asian Development tour wins, Irawan won two tournaments on the domestic Professional Golf of Malaysia Tour, winning the season-ending PGM Maybank Players Championship in 2014 and 2017.

== Death ==
On 7 April 2019 Irawan was found dead at his hotel in Sanya, China. He was taking part in the Sanya Championship, the second event of the 2019 PGA Tour China season. Early indications were that his death was from natural causes, but the tour added that "the coroner has not completed his report." There were attempts to revive him with CPR, but after 45 minutes of revival efforts, he was pronounced dead.

== Professional wins (4) ==
=== Asian Development Tour wins (2) ===
No.	Date	Tournament	Winning score	Margin of victory	Runner(s)-up
1	31 Jan 2015	Sime Darby Harvard Championship^{1}	−18 (63-71-68-68=270)	1 stroke	(New Zealand) Sean Riordan, (Malaysia) Sukree Othman
2	18 Apr 2015	ICTSI Eagle Ridge Invitational^{2}	−4 (73-69-67-71=280)	4 strokes	(Philippines) Miguel Tabuena

^{1}Co-sanctioned by the Professional Golf of Malaysia Tour
^{2}Co-sanctioned by the Philippine Golf Tour

=== Professional Golf of Malaysia Tour wins (3) ===
No.	Date	Tournament	Winning score	Margin of victory	Runner(s)-up
1	13 Dec 2014	Maybank Players Championship	−14 (64-70-71-69=274)	2 strokes	(Malaysia) Airil Rizman
2	31 Jan 2015	Sime Darby Harvard Championship^{1}	−18 (63-71-68-68=270)	1 stroke	(New Zealand) Sean Riordan, (Malaysia) Sukree Othman
3	9 Dec 2017	Maybank Players Championship (2)	−10 (73-70-70-65=278)	2 strokes	(Malaysia) Kemarol Baharin

^{1}Co-sanctioned by the Asian Development Tour
