= 2015 Professional Golf of Malaysia Tour =

Golf tour season

2015 Professional Golf of Malaysia Tour season
- Duration: 7 January 2015 – 12 December 2015
- Number of official events: 33
- Most wins: (Malaysia) Danny Chia (3) (Malaysia) Nicholas Fung (3)
- Order of Merit: (Malaysia) Danny Chia

The 2015 Professional Golf of Malaysia Tour was the fifth season of the Professional Golf of Malaysia Tour, the main professional golf tour in Malaysia since it was formed in 2010.

== Changes for 2015 ==
In November 2014, alongside the 2015 schedule announcement, it was announced that the format of the Order of Merit would be changed to include 50% of earnings from selected domestic and overseas tournaments.

== Schedule ==
The following table lists official events during the 2015 season.

Date	Tournament	Location	Purse (RM)	Winner (Note: The number in brackets after each winner's name is the number of Professional Golf of Malaysia Tour events they had won up to and including that tournament.)	OWGR points	Other tours (Note: ADT − Asian Development Tour; ASEAN − ASEAN PGA Tour.)
10 Jan	Panasonic Open Malaysia Tournament of Champions	Selangor	250,000	(Malaysia) Danny Chia (6)	n/a	
24 Jan	Kinrara Championship	Selangor	180,000	(Malaysia) Kenneth De Silva (1)	n/a	
31 Jan	Sime Darby Harvard Championship	Kedah	200,000	(Malaysia) Arie Irawan (2)	6	ADT
14 Feb	LADA Langkawi Championship	Kedah	200,000	(Malaysia) Wilson Choo (2)	6	ADT
28 Feb	Nilai Springs Championship	Negeri Sembilan	180,000	(Malaysia) Nicholas Fung (10)	n/a	
7 Mar	Kelantan Championship	Kelantan	180,000	(Malaysia) R. Nachimuthu (8)	n/a	
14 Mar	Terengganu Championship	Terengganu	200,000	(Thailand) Panuwat Muenlek (n/a)	6	ADT
21 Mar	CCM Rahman Putra Championship	Selangor	200,000	(Thailand) Phachara Khongwatmai (n/a)	6	ADT
4 Apr	UMW Impian Championship	Selangor	180,000	(Malaysia) Kemarol Baharin (2)	n/a	ASEAN
11 Apr	Johor Championship	Johor	200,000	(Malaysia) Nicholas Fung (11)	6	ADT
25 Apr	Danau Championship	Selangor	180,000	(Malaysia) Daeng Abdul Rahman (a) (1)	n/a	
9 May	Sabah Championship	Sabah	200,000	(Thailand) Nirun Sae-ueng (n/a)	6	ADT
16 May	MNRB Sarawak Championship	Sarawak	200,000	(Finland) Janne Kaske (n/a)	6	ADT
30 May	Port Dickson Championship	Negeri Sembilan	200,000	(New Zealand) Sean Riordan (n/a)	6	ADT
7 Jun	Matchplay Championship	Selangor	180,000	(Malaysia) Danny Chia (7)	n/a	
13 Jun	Rahman Putra Championship	Selangor	250,000	(Australia) Jake Stirling (n/a)	6	ADT
25 Jul	Swiss Garden Championship	Perak	180,000	(Malaysia) Airil Rizman (6)	n/a	
1 Aug	Taiping Championship	Perak	180,000	(Malaysia) Nicholas Fung (12)	n/a	
15 Aug	Northport Glenmarie Championship	Selangor	200,000	(United States) Blake Snyder (n/a)	6	ADT
29 Aug	Orna Championship	Melaka	180,000	(Malaysia) Low Khai Jei (a) (1)	n/a	
5 Sep	I&P Group Championship	Selangor	180,000	(Malaysia) Airil Rizman (7)	n/a	
12 Sep	Penang Championship	Penang	180,000	(Malaysia) Khor Kheng Hwai (1)	n/a	ASEAN
19 Sep	Bukit Jawi Championship	Penang	200,000	(Malaysia) Danny Chia (8)	6	ADT
3 Oct	Perlis Championship	Perlis	180,000	(Malaysia) Ben Leong (2)	n/a	
10 Oct	Impian Championship	Selangor	180,000	(Malaysia) Irfan Yusoff (1)	n/a	
17 Oct	PD Championship	Negeri Sembilan	180,000	(Thailand) Natthapong Niyomchon (n/a)	n/a	ASEAN
24 Oct	Kinrara Championship	Selangor	200,000	(Thailand) Poom Saksansin (n/a)	6	ADT
31 Oct	Danau Championship II	Selangor	180,000	(Malaysia) Gavin Green (2)	n/a	
7 Nov	Tiara Championship	Melaka	200,000	(United States) Casey O'Toole (n/a)	6	ADT
21 Nov	Nilai Springs Championship	Negeri Sembilan	200,000	(Thailand) Chanat Sakulpolphaisan (n/a)	6	ADT
28 Nov	MIDF KLGCC Championship	Selangor	200,000	(Finland) Janne Kaske (n/a)	6	ADT
5 Dec	Darulaman Championship	Kedah	180,000	(Malaysia) Iylia Jamil (2)	n/a	
12 Dec	Maybank Players Championship	Selangor	275,000	(Malaysia) R. Nachimuthu (9)	n/a	

== Order of Merit ==
The Order of Merit was based on prize money won during the season, calculated in Malaysian ringgit.

Position	Player	Prize money (RM)
1	(Malaysia) Danny Chia	771,373
2	(Malaysia) Nicholas Fung	542,516
3	(Malaysia) R. Nachimuthu	256,591
4	(Malaysia) Sukree Othman	235,913
5	(Malaysia) Ben Leong	203,940
