= 2012 Asian Development Tour =

Golf tour season

2012 Asian Development Tour season
- Duration: 8 March 2012 – 23 November 2012
- Number of official events: 13
- Most wins: (Philippines) Jay Bayron (2)
- Order of Merit: (Philippines) Jay Bayron

The 2012 Asian Development Tour was the third season of the Asian Development Tour, the official development tour to the Asian Tour.

== Schedule ==
The following table lists official events during the 2012 season.

Date	Tournament	Host country	Purse (US$)	Winner (Note: The number in brackets after each winner's name is the number of Asian Development Tour events they had won up to and including that tournament. It is rare for someone to accumulate many wins on the Asian Development Tour as success at this level usually leads to promotion to the Asian Tour.)	Other tours (Note: PGM − Professional Golf of Malaysia Tour; PHI − Philippine Golf Tour; TWN − Taiwan PGA Tour.)
11 Mar	CCM Impian Masters	Malaysia	RM180,000	(Singapore) Mardan Mamat (1)	PGM
7 Apr	Johor Masters	Malaysia	RM180,000	(Australia) Luke Bleumink (1)	PGM
13 May	PGM ADT Masters	Malaysia	RM180,000	(England) Peter Richardson (1)	PGM
28 Jun	Terengganu Masters	Malaysia	RM220,000	(Australia) Ryan Bulloch (1)	PGM
7 Jul	Taman Dayu Championship	Indonesia	75,000	(India) Sujjan Singh (1)	
14 Jul	Bii Maybank ADT Challenge	Indonesia	50,000	(Philippines) Jay Bayron (2)	
11 Aug	Aboitiz Invitational	Philippines	65,000	(Philippines) Elmer Salvador (1)	PHI
18 Aug	ICTSI Orchard Championship	Philippines	60,000	(Singapore) Quincy Quek (1)	PHI
26 Aug	Ballantine's Taiwan Championship	Taiwan	110,000	(Taiwan) Hsieh Chi-Hsien (1)	TWN
7 Oct	Sarawak Masters	Malaysia	RM180,000	(Malaysia) Kenneth De Silva (1)	PGM
3 Nov	Eastwood Valley Masters	Malaysia	80,000	(Philippines) Jay Bayron (3)	PGM
11 Nov	MIDF KLGCC Masters	Malaysia	RM180,000	(United States) Brian Locke (1)	PGM
23 Nov	Yeangder ADT	Taiwan	120,000	(Taiwan) Lu Chien-soon (1)	TWN

== Order of Merit ==
The Order of Merit was based on prize money won during the season, calculated in U.S. dollars. The top three players on the Order of Merit earned status to play on the 2013 Asian Tour.

Position	Player	Prize money ($)
1	(Philippines) Jay Bayron	34,310
2	(Taiwan) Hsu Mong-nan	28,309
3	(England) Peter Richardson	27,202
4	(Taiwan) Hsieh Chi-hsien	23,426
5	(Canada) Lindsay Renolds	19,146
