= 2026 Professional Golf of Malaysia Tour =

Golf tour season

2026 Professional Golf of Malaysia Tour season
- Duration: 11 February 2026 – 26 November 2026
- Number of official events: 10

The 2026 Professional Golf of Malaysia Tour is the 14th season of the Professional Golf of Malaysia Tour, the main professional golf tour in Malaysia since it was formed in 2010.

== Schedule ==
The following table lists official events during the 2026 season.

Date	Tournament	Location	Purse (RM)	Winner (Note: The number in brackets after each winner's name is the number of Professional Golf of Malaysia Tour events they had won up to and including that tournament.)	OWGR points	Other tours (Note: ADT − Asian Development Tour.)
14 Feb	PKNS Selangor Masters	Selangor	US$175,000	(Singapore) Nicklaus Chiam (n/a)	3.36	ADT
9 Apr	KGPA Closed Championship	Selangor	180,000	(Malaysia) Aiden Kei (a) (1)	n/a	
23 Apr	Tun Ahmad Sarji Trophy	Selangor	180,000	(Malaysia) Gavin Green (8)	n/a	
9 May	ADT Players Championship	Selangor	US$110,000	(India) Pukhraj Singh Gill (n/a)	2.23	ADT
25 Jun	Penang Closed Championship	Penang	180,000	(Malaysia) Shahriffuddin Ariffin (7)	n/a	
16 Jul	Royal Pekan Closed Championship	Pahang	180,000	(Malaysia) Shaifubari Muda (2)	n/a	
23 Jul	Royal Pahang Closed Championship	Pahang	200,000	(Malaysia) Amir Nazrin (2)	n/a	
20 Aug	Port Dickson Closed Championship	Negeri Sembilan	180,000	(Malaysia) Ervin Chang (3)	n/a	
24 Sep	Tiara Melaka Closed Championship	Melaka	180,000	(Malaysia) Edven Ying (5)	n/a	
26 Nov	Palm Resort Closed Championship	Johor	180,000		n/a	
