= 2025 Professional Golf of Malaysia Tour =

Golf tour season

2025 Professional Golf of Malaysia Tour season
- Duration: 22 January 2025 – 20 November 2025
- Number of official events: 10
- Most wins: (Malaysia) Edven Ying (3)
- Order of Merit: (Malaysia) Edven Ying

The 2025 Professional Golf of Malaysia Tour was the 13th season of the Professional Golf of Malaysia Tour, the main professional golf tour in Malaysia since it was formed in 2010.

== Schedule ==
The following table lists official events during the 2025 season.

| Date | Tournament | Location | Purse (RM) | Winner (Note: The number in brackets after each winner's name is the number of Professional Golf of Malaysia Tour events they had won up to and including that tournament.) | OWGR points | Other tours (Note: ADT − Asian Development Tour.) |
|---|---|---|---|---|---|---|
| 25 Jan | PKNS Selangor Masters | Selangor | US$200,000 | (Thailand) Tawit Polthai (n/a) | 2.36 | ADT |
| 27 Feb | Seri Selangor Championship | Selangor | 180,000 | (Malaysia) Kim Leun Kwang (3) | n/a | |
| 8 May | Tun Ahmad Sarji Trophy | Selangor | 180,000 | (Malaysia) Anson Yeo (a) (1) | n/a | |
| 22 May | KGPA Closed Championship | Selangor | 180,000 | (Malaysia) Ben Leong (13) | n/a | |
| 26 Jun | Penang Closed Championship | Penang | 180,000 | (Malaysia) Ben Leong (14) | n/a | |
| 24 Jul | Royal Pekan Closed Championship | Pahang | 180,000 | (Malaysia) Ervin Chang (2) | n/a | |
| 31 Jul | Royal Pahang Closed Championship | Pahang | 180,000 | (Malaysia) Edven Ying (2) | n/a | |
| 21 Aug | Port Dickson Closed Championship | Negeri Sembilan | 180,000 | (Malaysia) Edven Ying (3) | n/a | |
| 25 Sep | Melaka Closed Championship | Melaka | 180,000 | (Malaysia) Paul San (4) | n/a | |
| 20 Nov | Palm Resort Closed Championship | Johor | 180,000 | (Malaysia) Edven Ying (4) | n/a | |

== Order of Merit ==
The Order of Merit was based on prize money won during the season, calculated in Malaysian ringgit.

| Position | Player | Prize money (RM) |
|---|---|---|
| 1 | (Malaysia) Edven Ying | 151,454 |
| 2 | (Malaysia) Ben Leong | 123,252 |
| 3 | (Malaysia) Shahriffudin Ariffin | 84,794 |
| 4 | (Malaysia) Daeng Rahman | 69,858 |
| 5 | (Malaysia) Marcus Lim | 67,365 |
