= 2012 Professional Golf of Malaysia Tour =

Golf tour season

2012 Professional Golf of Malaysia Tour season
- Duration: 11 January 2012 – 22 December 2012
- Number of official events: 20
- Most wins: (Malaysia) Sukree Othman (3) (Malaysia) Airil Rizman (3)
- Order of Merit: (Malaysia) Nicholas Fung

The 2012 Professional Golf of Malaysia Tour was the second season of the Professional Golf of Malaysia Tour, the main professional golf tour in Malaysia since it was formed in 2010.

== Schedule ==
The following table lists official events during the 2012 season.

Date	Tournament	Location	Purse (RM)	Winner (Note: The number in brackets after each winner's name is the number of Professional Golf of Malaysia Tour events they had won up to and including that tournament.)	Other tours (Note: ADT − Asian Development Tour.)
14 Jan	Sime Darby Harvard Classic	Kedah	125,000	(Malaysia) Shaifubari Muda (1)	
11 Feb	Perlis Classic	Perlis	125,000	(Malaysia) Airil Rizman (1)	
22 Feb	Kelantan Classic	Kelantan	125,000	(Malaysia) Sukree Othman (2)	
11 Mar	CCM Impian Masters	Selangor	180,000	(Singapore) Mardan Mamat (n/a)	ADT
31 Mar	Perak Classic	Perak	125,000	(Malaysia) R. Nachimuthu (3)	
7 Apr	Johor Masters	Johor	180,000	(Australia) Luke Bleumink (n/a)	ADT
21 Apr	Sabah Classic	Sabah	200,000	(Malaysia) R. Nachimuthu (4)	
13 May	PGM ADT Masters	Melaka	180,000	(England) Peter Richardson (n/a)	ADT
26 May	I&P Kinrara Classic	Selangor	125,000	(Malaysia) Sukree Othman (3)	
9 Jun	Melaka Classic	Melaka	125,000	(Malaysia) Sukree Othman (4)	
28 Jun	Terengganu Masters	Terengganu	220,000	(Australia) Ryan Bulloch (n/a)	ADT
14 Jul	PNB Lanjut Classic	Pahang	125,000	(Malaysia) Airil Rizman (2)	
30 Aug	Northport Templer Park Classic	Selangor	125,000	(Malaysia) Airil Rizman (3)	
22 Sep	Penang Classic	Penang	125,000	(Malaysia) S. Murthy (2)	
7 Oct	Sarawak Masters	Sarawak	180,000	(Malaysia) Kenneth De Silva (1)	ADT
20 Oct	Negeri Sembilan Classic	Negeri Sembilan	125,000	(Malaysia) Nicholas Fung (3)	
3 Nov	Eastwood Valley Masters	Sarawak	US$80,000	(Philippines) Jay Bayron (n/a)	ADT
11 Nov	MIDF KLGCC Masters	Selangor	180,000	(United States) Brian Locke (n/a)	ADT
22 Nov	UMW Glenmarie Classic	Selangor	130,000	(Malaysia) Nicholas Fung (4)	
22 Dec	Maybank Players Championship	Selangor	300,000	(Malaysia) Akhmal Tarmizee (1)	

== Order of Merit ==
The Order of Merit was based on prize money won during the season, calculated in Malaysian ringgit.

Position	Player	Prize money (RM)
1	(Malaysia) Nicholas Fung	159,635
2	(Malaysia) Sukree Othman	145,598
3	(Malaysia) R. Nachimuthu	141,037
4	(Malaysia) Rashid Ismail	125,225
5	(Malaysia) Airil Rizman	120,595
