= 2016 Professional Golf of Malaysia Tour =

Golf tour season

2016 Professional Golf of Malaysia Tour season
- Duration: 20 January 2016 – 10 December 2016
- Number of official events: 27
- Most wins: (Malaysia) Ben Leong (5)
- Order of Merit: (Malaysia) Nicholas Fung

The 2016 Professional Golf of Malaysia Tour was the sixth season of the Professional Golf of Malaysia Tour, the main professional golf tour in Malaysia since it was formed in 2010.

== Schedule ==
The following table lists official events during the 2016 season.

Date	Tournament	Location	Purse (RM)	Winner (Note: The number in brackets after each winner's name is the number of Professional Golf of Malaysia Tour events they had won up to and including that tournament.)	OWGR points	Other tours (Note: ADT − Asian Development Tour; ASEAN − ASEAN PGA Tour; PTINA − PGA Tour of Indonesia.)
23 Jan	I&P Group Championship	Selangor	180,000	(Malaysia) Nicholas Fung (13)	n/a	
30 Jan	CCM Rahman Putra Championship	Selangor	200,000	(United States) Josh Salah (n/a)	6	ADT
6 Feb	UMW Championship	Selangor	200,000	(Japan) Shunya Takeyasu (n/a)	6	ADT
27 Feb	Northport Glenmarie Championship	Selangor	200,000	(Malaysia) Gavin Green (3)	6	ADT
5 Mar	Sime Darby Harvard Championship	Kedah	180,000	(Malaysia) Shaaban Hussin (4)	n/a	
12 Mar	Clearwater Championship	Perak	200,000	(United States) John Michael O'Toole (n/a)	6	ADT
26 Mar	LADA Langkawi Championship	Kedah	200,000	(Indonesia) George Gandranata (n/a)	6	ADT
9 Apr	Darul Aman Championship	Kedah	200,000	(Thailand) Panuwat Muenlek (n/a)	6	ADT
16 Apr	Kelantan Championship	Kelantan	180,000	(Malaysia) Nicholas Fung (14)	n/a	
30 Apr	Palm Resort Championship	Johor	200,000	(Thailand) Sutijet Kooratanapisan (n/a)	6	ADT
14 May	Bukit Jawi Championship	Kedah	200,000	(Malaysia) Danny Chia (9)	6	ADT
28 May	PD Championship	Negeri Sembilan	200,000	(Thailand) Panuwat Muenlek (n/a)	6	ADT
4 Jun	Penang Championship	Penang	200,000	(United States) Nick Sherwood (n/a)	6	ADT
16 Jul	Port Dickson Championship	Negeri Sembilan	180,000	(Malaysia) Sasidaran Muthiah (1)	n/a	
23 Jul	Jimei Korea Kulim Championship	Kedah	US$150,000	(Thailand) Gunn Charoenkul (n/a)	n/a	ASEAN
30 Jul	Impian Championship	Selangor	180,000	(Malaysia) Ben Leong (3)	n/a	
6 Aug	I&P Match Play Championship	Selangor	180,000	(Malaysia) Nicholas Fung (15)	n/a	
13 Aug	Sabah Championship	Sabah	180,000	(Malaysia) R. Nachimuthu (10)	n/a	
20 Aug	MNRB Sarawak Championship	Sarawak	200,000	(South Africa) Mathiam Keyser (n/a)	6	ADT
10 Sep	MIDF TPC Kuala Lumpur Championship	Selangor	200,000	(Sweden) Oskar Arvidsson (n/a)	6	ADT
21 Sep	SapuraKencana National Classic	Selangor	150,000	(Malaysia) Gavin Green (4)	n/a	
8 Oct	Perlis Championship	Perlis	180,000	(Malaysia) Sukree Othman (6)	n/a	
15 Oct	Terengganu Championship	Terengganu	180,000	(Malaysia) Airil Rizman (8)	n/a	
22 Oct	Orna Championship	Melaka	180,000	(Malaysia) Ben Leong (4)	n/a	
5 Nov	PGM IGT Championship	Selangor	250,000	(Malaysia) Ben Leong (5)	n/a	PTINA
12 Nov	Tiara Melaka Championship	Melaka	180,000	(Malaysia) Ben Leong (6)	n/a	
10 Dec	Maybank Players Championship	Selangor	275,000	(Malaysia) Ben Leong (7)	n/a	

== Order of Merit ==
The Order of Merit was based on prize money won during the season, calculated in Malaysian ringgit.

Position	Player	Prize money (RM)
1	(Malaysia) Nicholas Fung	647,699
2	(Malaysia) Danny Chia	344,297
3	(Malaysia) Ben Leong	287,970
4	(Malaysia) Gavin Green	262,894
5	(Malaysia) R. Nachimuthu	166,612
