= Danny Chia =

Malaysian professional golfer

Personal information
- Full name: Danny Chia Chee Wing
- Nationality: Malaysia
- Born: 29 November 1972 (age 53)
- Height: 5 ft 7 in (1.70 m)
- Weight: 165 lb (75 kg; 11.8 st)

Career
- Sport: Golf
- Turned professional: 1996
- Current tour: Asian Tour
- Former tours: Asian Development Tour; ASEAN PGA Tour; Professional Golf of Malaysia Tour
- Professional wins: 29

Number of wins by tour
- Asian Tour: 2
- Other: 27

Best results in major championships
- Masters Tournament: DNP
- PGA Championship: DNP
- U.S. Open: DNP
- The Open Championship: T55: 2010

Achievements and awards
- Professional Golf of Malaysia Tour Order of Merit winner: 2015

Chinese name
- Traditional Chinese: 謝志榮
- Simplified Chinese: 谢志荣
- Hanyu Pinyin: Xiè Zhìróng
- Hokkien POJ: Chiā Chì-êng

Danny Chia Chee Wing (born 29 November 1972) is a Malaysian professional golfer.

== Early life and amateur career ==
In 1972, Chia was born. He was the leading Malaysian amateur in the mid-1990s.

== Professional career ==
In 1996, Chia turned professional. He plays on the Asian Tour, where he won the 2002 Taiwan Open. He was the first Malaysian to win on the Tour. He has also won several lower profile professional tournaments in Malaysia and elsewhere.

In 2002, Chia became the second Malaysian to play in The Open Championship. Chia represented Malaysia in the WGC-World Cup in 2001 and 2002.

== Amateur wins ==
- 1993 Malaysian Amateur Championship, Selangor Amateur Open (Malaysia)
- 1994 Malaysian Amateur Championship, Selangor Amateur Open (Malaysia)
- 1995 Malaysian Amateur Championship, Selangor Amateur Open (Malaysia)

== Professional wins (29) ==
=== Asian Tour wins (2) ===
No.	Date	Tournament	Winning score	Margin of victory	Runner(s)-up
1	22 Sep 2002	Acer Taiwan Open	+3 (76-70-77-68=291)	2 strokes	(Taiwan) Hsieh Yu-shu, (Taiwan) Lin Chie-hsiang
2	3 Oct 2015	Mercuries Taiwan Masters^{1}	−3 (67-70-73-73=285)	2 strokes	(China) Liang Wenchong

^{1}Co-sanctioned by the Taiwan PGA Tour

=== Asian Development Tour wins (4) ===
No.	Date	Tournament	Winning score	Margin of victory	Runner(s)-up
1	9 Mar 2013	Northport Glenmarie Masters^{1}	−8 (67-68-74-71=280)	1 stroke	(Malaysia) Nicholas Fung
2	10 May 2014	Northport Glenmarie Championship^{1} (2)	−13 (72-67-68-68=275)	Playoff	(Thailand) Sattaya Supupramai
3	19 Sep 2015	Bukit Jawi Championship^{1}	−21 (67-66-69-65=267)	6 strokes	(United States) Casey O'Toole
4	14 May 2016	Bukit Jawi Championship^{1} (2)	−18 (71-67-65-67=270)	5 strokes	(Malaysia) Gavin Green, (Malaysia) Ben Leong

^{1}Co-sanctioned by the Professional Golf of Malaysia Tour

=== ASEAN PGA Tour wins (2) ===
No.	Date	Tournament	Winning score	Margin of victory	Runners-up
1	8 Sep 2007	International Championship	+3 (71-74-76-70=291)	3 strokes	(Malaysia) Anis Helmi Hassan, (Indonesia) Suprapto (a)
2	30 Nov 2008	Mercedes-Benz Masters Thailand	−8 (64-71-69-72=276)	2 strokes	(Malaysia) S. Siva Chandhran, (Thailand) Nakul Vichitryuthasastr

=== Professional Golf of Malaysia Tour wins (14) ===
No.	Date	Tournament	Winning score	Margin of victory	Runner(s)-up
1	30 Dec 2010 (2011 season)	Impian Masters	−13 (68-71-70-66=275)	Playoff	(Malaysia) Airil Rizman
2	23 Jun 2011	Clearwater Classic	−16 (69-68-69-66=276)	4 strokes	(Malaysia) Rashid Ismail
3	6 Jan 2013	I&P Kinrara Classic	−11 (72-63-72-66=273)	2 strokes	(Malaysia) S. Siva Chandhran
4	9 Mar 2013	Northport Glenmarie Masters^{1}	−8 (67-68-74-71=280)	1 stroke	(Malaysia) Nicholas Fung
5	10 May 2014	Northport Glenmarie Championship^{1} (2)	−13 (72-67-68-68=275)	Playoff	(Thailand) Sattaya Supupramai
6	10 Jan 2015	Panasonic Open Malaysia Tournament of Champions	−16 (71-64-67-70=272)	8 strokes	(Singapore) Mardan Mamat
7	7 Jun 2015	Matchplay Championship	5 and 3		(Malaysia) R. Nachimuthu
8	19 Sep 2015	Bukit Jawi Championship^{1}	−21 (67-66-69-65=267)	6 strokes	(United States) Casey O'Toole
9	14 May 2016	Bukit Jawi Championship^{1} (2)	−18 (71-67-65-67=270)	5 strokes	(Malaysia) Gavin Green, (Malaysia) Ben Leong
10	28 Jul 2017	CIMB National Championship	−8 (68-70-73-69=280)	Playoff	(Malaysia) Gavin Green
11	3 Mar 2018	Johor Championship I	−13 (70-71-70-64=275)	Playoff	(Malaysia) Shahriffuddin Ariffin
12	11 Mar 2023	Tun Ahmad Sarji Trophy	−7 (70-71-70-70=281)	4 strokes	(Malaysia) Ervin Chang, (Malaysia) Paul San
13	13 Jul 2023	Corolla Cup	−12 (68-67-69=204)	4 strokes	(Malaysia) Marcus Lim (a)
14	7 Nov 2024	Yaris Cup	−7 (69-70-67=206)	2 strokes	(Malaysia) Afif Fathi

^{1}Co-sanctioned by the Asian Development Tour

=== Other wins (11) ===
- 1996 EVA Air Open (Singapore), Jakarta Raya Open (Indonesia)
- 1999 Singapore Mini Tour event, Malaysian Mini Tour event
- 2001 Champion of Champions (Singapore), PNB OOM Challenge (Malaysia)
- 2002 Sime Darby Masters (Malaysia)
- 2003 Genting Masters (Malaysia), Classic I (Malaysia), Classic II (Malaysia)
- 2004 Kinrara Masters (Malaysia)

== Results in major championships ==
Tournament	2005	2006	2007	2008	2009	2010
The Open Championship	CUT			CUT		T55

Note: Chia only played in The Open Championship.

Did not play

CUT = missed the half-way cut
"T" = tied

== Results in World Golf Championships ==
Tournament	2015
Championship	
Match Play	
Invitational	
Champions	67

Did not play

== Team appearances ==
Professional

- World Cup (representing Malaysia): 2000, 2001, 2016
- EurAsia Cup (representing Asia): 2016
