= 2017 Professional Golf of Malaysia Tour =

Golf tour season

2017 Professional Golf of Malaysia Tour season
- Duration: 4 January 2017 – 9 December 2017
- Number of official events: 20
- Most wins: (Malaysia) Khor Kheng Hwai (2) (Malaysia) Ben Leong (2)
- Order of Merit: (Malaysia) Shahriffuddin Ariffin

The 2017 Professional Golf of Malaysia Tour was the seventh season of the Professional Golf of Malaysia Tour, the main professional golf tour in Malaysia since it was formed in 2010.

== Schedule ==
The following table lists official events during the 2017 season.

Date	Tournament	Location	Purse (RM)	Winner (Note: The number in brackets after each winner's name is the number of Professional Golf of Malaysia Tour events they had won up to and including that tournament.)	OWGR points	Other tours (Note: ADT − Asian Development Tour; PTINA − PGA Tour of Indonesia.)
7 Jan	Sime Darby Impian Championship	Selangor	185,000	(Malaysia) Ben Leong (8)	n/a	
21 Jan	CCM Seriemas Championship	Selangor	220,000	(Australia) Martin Dive (n/a)	6	ADT
5 Feb	I&P Group Matchplay Championship	Selangor	185,000	(Malaysia) Khor Kheng Hwai (2)	n/a	
18 Feb	Panasonic Malaysia Championship	Selangor	250,000	(United States) Brett Munson (n/a)	6	ADT
4 Mar	Palm Resort Championship	Johor	185,000	(Malaysia) Khor Kheng Hwai (3)	n/a	
18 Mar	Northport Championship	Selangor	200,000	(Malaysia) Ben Leong (9)	6	ADT
1 Apr	Port Dickson Championship	Negeri Sembilan	185,000	(Malaysia) Daeng Abdul Rahman (2)	n/a	
15 Apr	UMW Championship	Selangor	200,000	(Malaysia) Nicholas Fung (16)	6	ADT
24 May	Perlis Championship	Selangor	200,000	(Malaysia) Sasidaran Muthiah (2)	n/a	
15 Jul	Darulaman Championship	Kedah	200,000	(Thailand) Nattawat Suvajanakorn (n/a)	6	ADT
28 Jul	CIMB National Championship	Selangor	200,000	(Malaysia) Danny Chia (10)	n/a	
26 Aug	Tiara Melaka Championship	Melaka	185,000	(Malaysia) Shahriffuddin Ariffin (1)	n/a	
23 Sep	EurAsia Sabah Championship	Sabah	200,000	(United States) John Michael O'Toole (n/a)	6	ADT
30 Sep	Labuan Championship	Labuan	200,000	(South Africa) Mathiam Keyser (n/a)	6	ADT
7 Oct	MNRB Championship	Sarawak	200,000	(United States) Blake Snyder (n/a)	6	ADT
14 Oct	Miri Championship	Sarawak	180,000	(Malaysia) Airil Rizman (9)	n/a	
28 Oct	MIDF Championship	Selangor	200,000	(Thailand) Kasidit Lepkurte (n/a)	6	ADT
11 Nov	EurAsia Perak Championship	Perak	200,000	(United States) John Catlin (n/a)	n/a	ADT
25 Nov	GlobalOne Championship	Selangor	200,000	(Thailand) Panuwat Muenlek (n/a)	6	ADT
9 Dec	Maybank Players Championship	Selangor	275,000	(Malaysia) Arie Irawan (3)	n/a	

=== Unofficial events ===
The following events were sanctioned by the Professional Golf of Malaysia Tour, but did not carry official money, nor were wins official.

Date	Tournament	Location	Purse (RM)	Winners	OWGR points	Other tours
7 Sep	PGM IGT Championship	Indonesia	Rp600,000,000	Team IGT	n/a	PTINA

== Order of Merit ==
The Order of Merit was based on prize money won during the season, calculated in Malaysian ringgit.

Position	Player	Prize money (RM)
1	(Malaysia) Shahriffuddin Ariffin	137,963
2	(Malaysia) R. Nachimuthu	120,782
3	(Malaysia) Arie Irawan	115,321
4	(Malaysia) Sukree Othman	93,900
5	(Malaysia) Khor Kheng Hwai	90,738
