= 2011 Asian Development Tour =

Golf tour season

2011 Asian Development Tour season
- Duration: 3 February 2011 – 25 September 2011
- Number of official events: 8
- Order of Merit: (United States) Jonathan Moore

The 2011 Asian Development Tour was the second season of the Asian Development Tour, the official development tour to the Asian Tour.

== Schedule ==
The following table lists official events during the 2011 season.

Date	Tournament	Host country	Purse (US$)	Winner (Note: The number in brackets after each winner's name is the number of Asian Development Tour events they had won up to and including that tournament. It is rare for someone to accumulate many wins on the Asian Development Tour as success at this level usually leads to promotion to the Asian Tour.)	Other tours (Note: PGM − Professional Golf of Malaysia Tour; PHI − Philippine Golf Tour; TWN − Taiwan PGA Tour.)
6 Feb	Grameenphone Bangladesh Masters	Bangladesh	75,000	(Bangladesh) Siddikur Rahman (1)	
1 May	Clearwater Masters	Malaysia	75,000	(United States) Berry Henson (1)	
8 May	CCM Impian Classic	Malaysia	RM200,000	(United States) Jonathan Moore (1)	PGM
28 May	Transcend Open	Taiwan	130,000	(Taiwan) Chiang Chen-chih (1)	TWN
12 Jun	Melaka Classic	Malaysia	RM180,000	(Malaysia) S. Siva Chandhran (2)	PGM
28 Aug	Ballantine's Taiwan Championship	Taiwan	110,000	(Taiwan) Kao Shang-hung (1)	TWN
3 Sep	Aboitiz Invitational	Philippines	65,000	(Philippines) Jay Bayron (1)	PHI
25 Sep	MIDF KLGCC Classic	Malaysia	RM200,000	(Netherlands) Guido van der Valk (1)	PGM

== Order of Merit ==
The Order of Merit was based on prize money won during the season, calculated in U.S. dollars. The top three players on the Order of Merit earned status to play on the 2012 Asian Tour.

Position	Player	Prize money ($)
1	(United States) Jonathan Moore	29,580
2	(Taiwan) Chiang Chen-chih	23,342
3	(Taiwan) Kao Shang-hung	19,874
4	(Japan) Takafumi Kawane	17,253
5	(Philippines) Artemio Murakami	15,560
