= 2024 All Thailand Golf Tour =

Golf tour season

2024 All Thailand Golf Tour season
- Duration: 25 January 2024 – 17 November 2024
- Number of official events: 13
- Most wins: (Thailand) Ekpharit Wu (2)
- Order of Merit: (Thailand) Newport Laparojkit

The 2024 All Thailand Golf Tour was the 26th season of the All Thailand Golf Tour (formerly the TPC Tour), one of the main professional golf tours in Thailand since it was formed in 1999.

== Schedule ==
The following table lists official events during the 2024 season.

Date	Tournament	Location	Purse (฿)	Winner (Note: The number in brackets after each winner's name is the number of All Thailand Golf Tour events they had won up to and including that tournament.)	OWGR points	Other tours (Note: ADT − Asian Development Tour; THAPGA − Thailand PGA Tour.)
28 Jan	Boonchu Ruangkit Championship	Nakhon Ratchasima	5,000,000	(Thailand) Chanat Sakulpolphaisan (1)	2.66	
18 Feb	Singha E-San Open	Khon Kaen	3,000,000	(Thailand) Runchanapong Youprayong (1)	1.16	
7 Apr	Singha Championship	Rayong	3,000,000	(Thailand) Suteepat Prateeptienchai (1)	2.25	
5 May	All Thailand Partnership Trophy	Phuket	3,000,000	(Thailand) Kammalas Namuangruk (1)	2.05	ADT
12 May	Singha Laguna Phuket Open	Phuket	4,000,000	(Thailand) Pavit Tangkamolprasert (4)	2.88	ADT
16 Jun	Singha All Thailand Championship	Nakhon Pathom	3,000,000	(Thailand) Nirun Sae-ueng (1)	1.25	
28 Jul	Singha Chiang Mai Open	Chiang Mai	3,000,000	(Thailand) Nopparat Panichphol (2)	2.03	
11 Aug	Singha All Thailand Memorial	Chanthaburi	3,000,000	(Thailand) Ekpharit Wu (1)	1.20	
18 Aug	Singha Pattaya Open	Chonburi	3,000,000	(Thailand) Ekpharit Wu (2)	1.68	
8 Sep	Singha Bangkok Open	Pathum Thani	3,000,000	(Thailand) Atiruj Winaicharoenchai (3)	1.42	THAPGA
15 Sep	Singha-SAT MBK Championship	Pathum Thani	3,000,000	(Thailand) Panuphol Pittayarat (3)	1.42	THAPGA
10 Nov	Singha Classic	Nakhon Nayok	3,000,000	(Thailand) Newport Laparojkit (1)	0.62	
17 Nov	Thailand Open	Pathum Thani	5,000,000	(Thailand) Chayutpol Kittirattanapaiboon (1)	1.23	

== Order of Merit ==
The Order of Merit was based on prize money won during the season, calculated in Thai baht.

Position	Player	Prize money (฿)
1	(Thailand) Newport Laparojkit	1,132,733
2	(Thailand) Ekpharit Wu	1,125,000
3	(Thailand) Chanat Sakulpolphaisan	911,725
4	(Thailand) Kammalas Namuangruk	897,983
5	(Thailand) Suteepat Prateeptienchai	894,350
