= 2024 Professional Golf of Malaysia Tour =

Golf tour season

2024 Professional Golf of Malaysia Tour season
- Duration: 27 February 2024 – 23 November 2024
- Number of official events: 11
- Most wins: (Malaysia) Galven Green (2) (Malaysia) Paul San (2)
- Order of Merit: (Malaysia) Paul San

The 2024 Professional Golf of Malaysia Tour, titled as the 2024 Toyota Tour for sponsorship reasons, was the 12th season of the Professional Golf of Malaysia Tour, the main professional golf tour in Malaysia since it was formed in 2010.

== Schedule ==
The following table lists official events during the 2024 season.

Date	Tournament	Location	Purse (RM)	Winner (Note: The number in brackets after each winner's name is the number of Professional Golf of Malaysia Tour events they had won up to and including that tournament.)	OWGR points	Other tours (Note: ADT − Asian Development Tour.)
29 Feb	Tun Ahmad Sarji Trophy	Selangor	180,000	(Malaysia) Galven Green (2)	n/a	
25 Apr	Corolla Cross Cup	Selangor	180,000	(Malaysia) Galven Green (3)	n/a	
16 May	Vios Cup	Selangor	180,000	(Malaysia) Paul San (2)	n/a	
22 Jun	PKNS Selangor Masters	Selangor	US$175,000	(India) Rahil Gangjee (n/a)	2.07	ADT
27 Jun	Fortuner Cup	Sarawak	180,000	(Malaysia) Ben Leong (12)	n/a	
18 Jul	Hilux Cup	Sarawak	180,000	(Malaysia) Nasrullah Zulkifli (1)	n/a	
15 Aug	Supra Cup	Johor	180,000	(Malaysia) Paul San (3)	n/a	
26 Sep	Harrier Cup	Pahang	180,000	(Malaysia) Fakhrul Akmal (1)	n/a	
10 Oct	Alphard Cup	Penang	180,000	(Malaysia) Marcus Lim (2)	n/a	
7 Nov	Yaris Cup	Selangor	180,000	(Malaysia) Danny Chia (14)	n/a	
23 Nov	Toyota Tour Championship	Selangor	400,000	(Thailand) Tanapat Pichaikool (n/a)	1.93	ADT

== Order of Merit ==
The Order of Merit was titled as the Toyota Tour Rankings and was based on prize money won during the season, calculated in Malaysian ringgit.

Position	Player	Prize money (RM)
1	(Malaysia) Paul San	121,686
2	(Malaysia) Ben Leong	105,255
3	(Malaysia) Marcus Lim	92,583
4	(Malaysia) Galven Green	84,249
5	(Malaysia) Fakhrul Akmal	72,395
