= 2016 Asian Development Tour =

Golf tour season

2016 Asian Development Tour season
- Duration: 6 January 2016 – 25 December 2016
- Number of official events: 24
- Most wins: (Malaysia) Gavin Green (2) (Thailand) Panuwat Muenlek (2) (Sweden) Oscar Zetterwall (2)
- Order of Merit: (United States) Johannes Veerman

The 2016 Asian Development Tour was the seventh season of the Asian Development Tour, the official development tour to the Asian Tour.

== Schedule ==
The following table lists official events during the 2016 season.

Date	Tournament	Host country	Purse (US$)	Winner (Note: The number in brackets after each winner's name is the number of Asian Development Tour events they had won up to and including that tournament. It is rare for someone to accumulate many wins on the Asian Development Tour as success at this level usually leads to promotion to the Asian Tour.)	OWGR points	Other tours (Note: ASEAN − ASEAN PGA Tour; ATGT − All Thailand Golf Tour; PGM − Professional Golf of Malaysia Tour; PTINA − PGA Tour of Indonesia; PHI − Philippine Golf Tour; TWN − Taiwan PGA Tour.)
9 Jan	Warisan Harta Sabah Masters	Malaysia	100,000	(Thailand) Namchok Tantipokhakul (1)	n/a	ASEAN
23 Jan	The Players Championship	Singapore	100,000	(Thailand) Itthipat Buranatanyarat (2)	6	
30 Jan	CCM Rahman Putra Championship	Malaysia	RM200,000	(United States) Josh Salah (1)	6	PGM
6 Feb	UMW Championship	Malaysia	RM200,000	(Japan) Shunya Takeyasu (1)	6	PGM
27 Feb	Northport Glenmarie Championship	Malaysia	RM200,000	(Malaysia) Gavin Green (2)	6	PGM
12 Mar	Clearwater Championship	Malaysia	RM200,000	(United States) John Michael O'Toole (1)	6	PGM
26 Mar	LADA Langkawi Championship	Malaysia	RM200,000	(Indonesia) George Gandranata (1)	6	PGM
3 Apr	Charming Yeangder ADT	Taiwan	150,000	(Thailand) Pavit Tangkamolprasert (5)	6	TWN
9 Apr	Darul Aman Championship	Malaysia	RM200,000	(Thailand) Panuwat Muenlek (2)	6	PGM
16 Apr	ICTSI Manila Southwoods Championship	Philippines	60,000	(Malaysia) Gavin Green (3)	7	PHI
23 Apr	ICTSI Sherwood Hills Classic	Philippines	60,000	(Sweden) Oscar Zetterwall (1)	6	PHI
30 Apr	Palm Resort Championship	Malaysia	RM200,000	(Thailand) Sutijet Kooratanapisan (1)	6	PGM
14 May	Bukit Jawi Championship	Malaysia	RM200,000	(Malaysia) Danny Chia (4)	6	PGM
22 May	Ambassador ADT	Taiwan	120,000	(Taiwan) Lin Wen-ko (1)	6	TWN
28 May	PD Championship	Malaysia	RM200,000	(Thailand) Panuwat Muenlek (3)	6	PGM
4 Jun	Penang Championship	Malaysia	RM200,000	(United States) Nick Sherwood (1)	6	PGM
10 Jul	Taifong Open	Taiwan	160,000	(United States) Johannes Veerman (1)	6	TWN
6 Aug	Aboitiz Invitational	Philippines	100,000	(Philippines) Jay Bayron (4)	6	PHI
20 Aug	MNRB Sarawak Championship	Malaysia	RM200,000	(South Africa) Mathiam Keyser (1)	6	PGM
27 Aug	Ciputra Golfpreneur Tournament	Indonesia	100,000	(Sweden) Oscar Zetterwall (2)	6	PTINA
10 Sep	MIDF TPC Kuala Lumpur Championship	Malaysia	RM200,000	(Sweden) Oskar Arvidsson (1)	6	PGM
26 Nov	Combiphar Golf Invitational	Indonesia	60,000	(United States) John Catlin (1)	6	PTINA
4 Dec	ADT Thongchai Jaidee Foundation	Thailand	฿4,000,000	(Thailand) Chapchai Nirat (1)	7	ATGT
25 Dec	Boonchu Ruangkit Championship	Thailand	฿3,500,000	(Thailand) Danthai Boonma (1)	9	ATGT

== Order of Merit ==
The Order of Merit was based on prize money won during the season, calculated in U.S. dollars. The top five players on the Order of Merit (not otherwise exempt) earned status to play on the 2017 Asian Tour.

Position	Player	Prize money ($)
1	(United States) Johannes Veerman	58,662
2	(Malaysia) Gavin Green	55,477
3	(Sweden) Oscar Zetterwall	44,449
4	(Thailand) Itthipat Buranatanyarat	34,743
5	(Thailand) Suradit Yongcharoenchai	32,002
6	(United States) John Michael O'Toole	27,271
