= 2018 Professional Golf of Malaysia Tour =

Golf tour season

2018 Professional Golf of Malaysia Tour season
- Duration: 17 January 2018 – 8 December 2018
- Number of official events: 20
- Most wins: (Malaysia) Sukree Othman (2)
- Order of Merit: (Malaysia) Shahriffuddin Ariffin

The 2018 Professional Golf of Malaysia Tour was the eighth season of the Professional Golf of Malaysia Tour, the main professional golf tour in Malaysia since it was formed in 2010.

== Schedule ==
The following table lists official events during the 2018 season.

Date	Tournament	Location	Purse (RM)	Winner (Note: The number in brackets after each winner's name is the number of Professional Golf of Malaysia Tour events they had won up to and including that tournament.)	OWGR points	Other tours (Note: ADT − Asian Development Tour; PTINA − PGA Tour of Indonesia.)
20 Jan	Perlis Championship	Perlis	200,000	(Malaysia) Sukree Othman (7)	n/a	
27 Jan	Darulaman Championship	Kedah	225,000	(United States) Kurt Kitayama (n/a)	6	ADT
3 Mar	Johor Championship I	Johor	200,000	(Malaysia) Danny Chia (11)	n/a	
17 Mar	Port Dickson Championship	Negeri Sembilan	200,000	(Malaysia) R. Nachimuthu (11)	n/a	
7 Apr	Johor Championship II	Johor	225,000	(Singapore) Johnson Poh (n/a)	6	ADT
21 Apr	Sime Darby Championship	Selangor	200,000	(Malaysia) Sukree Othman (8)	n/a	
5 May	Penang Championship	Penang	225,000	(Thailand) Nitithorn Thippong (n/a)	6	ADT
1 Jul	Matchplay Championship	Selangor	200,000	(Malaysia) S. Siva Chandhran (4)	n/a	
14 Jul	Pahang Championship	Pahang	200,000	(Malaysia) Kemarol Baharin (3)	n/a	
28 Jul	Northport Championship	Selangor	225,000	(United States) Josh Salah (n/a)	6	ADT
11 Aug	Sabah Championship	Sabah	225,000	(Malaysia) Ben Leong (10)	6	ADT
18 Aug	Labuan Championship	Labuan	225,000	(Malaysia) Shahriffuddin Ariffin (2)	6	ADT
8 Sep	Miri Championship	Sarawak	225,000	(Bangladesh) Shakhawat Sohel (n/a)	6	ADT
15 Sep	MNRB Championship	Sarawak	225,000	(Japan) Yutaka Araki (n/a)	6	ADT
22 Sep	Sarawak Championship	Sarawak	200,000	(Malaysia) Wilson Choo (3)	n/a	
6 Oct	UMW Championship	Selangor	225,000	(South Africa) Mathiam Keyser (n/a)	6	ADT
13 Oct	CCM Championship	Selangor	225,000	(United States) Han Lee (n/a)	6	ADT
20 Oct	MIDF Championship	Negeri Sembilan	225,000	(United States) Sam Gillis (n/a)	6	ADT
1 Dec	Maybank Championship	Selangor	225,000	(Japan) Shinichi Mizuno (n/a)	6	ADT
8 Dec	GlobalOne Players Championship	Negeri Sembilan	275,000	(Malaysia) Irfan Yusoff (2)	n/a	

=== Unofficial events ===
The following events were sanctioned by the Professional Golf of Malaysia Tour, but did not carry official money, nor were wins official.

Date	Tournament	Location	Purse (RM)	Winners	OWGR points	Other tours
3 Aug	PGM IGT Championship	Selangor	200,000	Team PGM	n/a	PTINA

== Order of Merit ==
The Order of Merit was based on prize money won during the season, calculated in Malaysian ringgit.

Position	Player	Prize money (RM)
1	(Malaysia) Shahriffuddin Ariffin	176,447
2	(Malaysia) Sukree Othman	166,118
3	(Malaysia) Amir Nazrin	118,728
4	(Malaysia) Kim Leun Kwang	111,728
5	(Malaysia) R. Nachimuthu	104,991
