= 2013 Asian Development Tour =

Golf tour season

2013 Asian Development Tour season
- Duration: 27 February 2013 – 11 January 2014
- Number of official events: 16
- Most wins: (United States) James Bowen (2) (Malaysia) Iain Steel (2)
- Order of Merit: (Malaysia) Nicholas Fung

The 2013 Asian Development Tour was the fourth season of the Asian Development Tour, the official development tour to the Asian Tour.

== OWGR inclusion ==
In July 2012, it was announced that all Asian Development Tour events, beginning in 2013, would receive Official World Golf Ranking points at the minimum level of 6 points for the winner of a 72-hole event.

== Schedule ==
The following table lists official events during the 2013 season.

Date	Tournament	Host country	Purse (US$)	Winner (Note: The number in brackets after each winner's name is the number of Asian Development Tour events they had won up to and including that tournament. It is rare for someone to accumulate many wins on the Asian Development Tour as success at this level usually leads to promotion to the Asian Tour.)	OWGR points	Other tours (Note: PGM − Professional Golf of Malaysia Tour; PHI − Philippine Golf Tour; TWN − Taiwan PGA Tour.)
2 Feb	CCM Rahman Putra Masters	Malaysia	RM200,000	(Scotland) James Byrne (1)	6	PGM
23 Feb	Sime Darby Harvard Masters	Malaysia	RM200,000	(United States) James Bowen (1)	6	PGM
9 Mar	Northport Glenmarie Masters	Malaysia	RM200,000	(Malaysia) Danny Chia (1)	6	PGM
13 Apr	Maybank Johor Masters	Malaysia	RM200,000	(England) Grant Jackson (1)	6	PGM
28 Apr	LADA Langkawi Masters	Malaysia	RM200,000	(Japan) Mitsuhiko Hashizume (1)	6	PGM
29 Jun	UMW Templer Park Masters	Malaysia	RM200,000	(Malaysia) Nicholas Fung (1)	6	PGM
20 Jul	Jakarta Classic	Indonesia	60,000	(United States) James Bowen (2)	6	
27 Jul	Aboitiz Invitational	Philippines	65,000	(Philippines) Elmer Salvador (2)	6	PHI
3 Aug	ICTSI Mount Malarayat Classic	Philippines	60,000	(Thailand) Sattaya Supupramai (1)	6	PHI
10 Aug	Ballantine's Taiwan Championship	Taiwan	60,000	(Malaysia) Iain Steel (1)	6	TWN
24 Aug	Terengganu Masters	Malaysia	RM200,000	(Malaysia) Iain Steel (2)	6	PGM
7 Sep	UMW Sabah Classic	Malaysia	RM180,000	(Taiwan) Chan Shih-chang (1)	6	PGM
6 Oct	MNRB Sarawak Masters	Malaysia	RM200,000	(Thailand) Jakraphan Premsirigorn (1)	6	PGM
3 Nov	ADT Chang Hwa Open	Taiwan	100,000	(Taiwan) Hung Chien-yao (1)	6	TWN
10 Nov	MIDF KLGCC Masters	Malaysia	RM200,000	(Japan) Masaru Takahashi (1)	6	PGM
11 Jan	Linc Group Jakarta Invitational	Indonesia	60,000	(Thailand) Pavit Tangkamolprasert (1)	6	

== Order of Merit ==
The Order of Merit was based on prize money won during the season, calculated in U.S. dollars. The top three players on the Order of Merit (not otherwise exempt) earned status to play on the 2014 Asian Tour.

Position	Player	Prize money ($)
1	(Malaysia) Nicholas Fung	43,998
2	(United States) James Bowen	39,825
3	(Malaysia) Iain Steel	27,136
4	(Canada) Lindsay Renolds	35,975
5	(England) Grant Jackson	30,540
