= 2024 Asian Development Tour =

Golf tour season

2024 Asian Development Tour season
- Duration: 13 March 2024 – 30 November 2024
- Number of official events: 12
- Most wins: (Pakistan) Ahmad Baig (2) (India) Rahil Gangjee (2) (Thailand) Tanapat Pichaikool (2)
- Order of Merit: (Thailand) Itthipat Buranatanyarat

The 2024 Asian Development Tour was the 13th season of the Asian Development Tour, the official development tour to the Asian Tour.

== Schedule ==
The following table lists official events during the 2024 season.

Date	Tournament	Host country	Purse (US$)	Winner (Note: The number in brackets after each winner's name is the number of Asian Development Tour events they had won up to and including that tournament. It is rare for someone to accumulate many wins on the Asian Development Tour as success at this level usually leads to promotion to the Asian Tour.)	OWGR points	Other tours (Note: ATGT − All Thailand Golf Tour; PGM − Professional Golf of Malaysia Tour; TWN − Taiwan PGA Tour; VGA − VGA Tour.)
15 Mar	Lexus Challenge	Vietnam	85,000	(Pakistan) Ahmad Baig (1)	1.45	VGA
5 May	All Thailand Partnership Trophy	Thailand	฿3,000,000	(Thailand) Kammalas Namuangruk (1)	2.05	ATGT
12 May	Singha Laguna Phuket Open	Thailand	฿4,000,000	(Thailand) Pavit Tangkamolprasert (8)	2.88	ATGT
14 Jun	Nam A Bank Vietnam Masters	Vietnam	85,000	(Pakistan) Ahmad Baig (2)	2.06	VGA
22 Jun	PKNS Selangor Masters	Malaysia	175,000	(India) Rahil Gangjee (2)	2.07	PGM
24 Aug	BNI Ciputra Golfpreneur Tournament	Indonesia	140,000	(Taiwan) Liu Yung-hua (1)	2.36	
31 Aug	BRG Open Golf Championship	Vietnam	100,000	(India) Rahil Gangjee (3)	1.75	VGA
13 Sep	Indonesia Pro-Am	Indonesia	125,000	(Thailand) Tanapat Pichaikool (1)	1.46	
28 Sep	ADT Players Championship	Cambodia	100,000	(Thailand) Nopparat Panichphol (1)	1.33	
10 Nov	Ambassador ADT Open	Taiwan	100,000	(Thailand) Witchayapat Sinsrang (1)	1.77	TWN
23 Nov	Toyota Tour Championship	Malaysia	RM400,000	(Thailand) Tanapat Pichaikool (2)	1.93	PGM
30 Nov	Aramco Invitational Tournament	Saudi Arabia	250,000	(Thailand) Itthipat Buranatanyarat (4)	1.60	

== Order of Merit ==
The Order of Merit was based on prize money won during the season, calculated in U.S. dollars. The top 10 players on the Order of Merit earned status to play on the 2025 Asian Tour.

Position	Player	Prize money ($)
1	(Thailand) Itthipat Buranatanyarat	66,897
2	(Thailand) Tanapat Pichaikool	57,428
3	(India) Rahil Gangjee	53,707
4	(Pakistan) Ahmad Baig	53,373
5	(Taiwan) Liu Yung-hua	34,185
6	(United States) Dodge Kemmer	33,219
7	(Thailand) Varanyu Rattanaphiboonkij	33,173
8	(Thailand) Witchayapat Sinsrang	30,676
9	(Thailand) Kosuke Hamamoto	30,282
10	(Hong Kong) Matthew Cheung	29,867
