= 2015 Asian Development Tour =

Golf tour season

2015 Asian Development Tour season
- Duration: 8 January 2015 – 27 December 2015
- Number of official events: 28
- Most wins: (Malaysia) Arie Irawan (2) (Finland) Janne Kaske (2) (Thailand) Phachara Khongwatmai (2)
- Order of Merit: (United States) Casey O'Toole

The 2015 Asian Development Tour was the sixth season of the Asian Development Tour, the official development tour to the Asian Tour.

== Schedule ==
The following table lists official events during the 2015 season.

Date	Tournament	Host country	Purse (US$)	Winner (Note: The number in brackets after each winner's name is the number of Asian Development Tour events they had won up to and including that tournament. It is rare for someone to accumulate many wins on the Asian Development Tour as success at this level usually leads to promotion to the Asian Tour.)	OWGR points	Other tours (Note: ATGT − All Thailand Golf Tour; PGM − Professional Golf of Malaysia Tour; PGTI − Professional Golf Tour of India; PHI − Philippine Golf Tour; TWN − Taiwan PGA Tour.)
11 Jan	Boonchu Ruangkit Championship	Thailand	฿3,000,000	(Thailand) Phiphatphong Naewsuk (1)	8	ATGT
31 Jan	Sime Darby Harvard Championship	Malaysia	RM200,000	(Malaysia) Arie Irawan (1)	6	PGM
14 Feb	LADA Langkawi Championship	Malaysia	RM200,000	(Malaysia) Wilson Choo (1)	6	PGM
14 Mar	Terengganu Championship	Malaysia	RM200,000	(Thailand) Panuwat Muenlek (1)	6	PGM
21 Mar	CCM Rahman Putra Championship	Malaysia	RM200,000	(Thailand) Phachara Khongwatmai (1)	6	PGM
29 Mar	Charming Yeangder ADT	Taiwan	150,000	(Taiwan) Hsieh Chi-hsien (2)	6	TWN
11 Apr	Johor Championship	Malaysia	RM200,000	(Malaysia) Nicholas Fung (2)	6	PGM
18 Apr	ICTSI Eagle Ridge Invitational	Philippines	60,000	(Malaysia) Arie Irawan (2)	7	PHI
25 Apr	ICTSI Sherwood Hills Classic	Philippines	60,000	(Thailand) Itthipat Buranatanyarat (1)	6	PHI
9 May	Sabah Championship	Malaysia	RM200,000	(Thailand) Nirun Sae-ueng (1)	6	PGM
16 May	MNRB Sarawak Championship	Malaysia	RM200,000	(Finland) Janne Kaske (1)	6	PGM
23 May	Ambassador ADT	Taiwan	120,000	(Taiwan) Chan Shih-chang (5)	6	TWN
30 May	Port Dickson Championship	Malaysia	RM200,000	(New Zealand) Sean Riordan (1)	6	PGM
13 Jun	Rahman Putra Championship	Malaysia	RM250,000	(Australia) Jake Stirling (1)	6	PGM
28 Jun	Bali National Golf Resort Championships	Indonesia	76,000	(Australia) Matthew Giles (1)	6	
2 Aug	Taifong Open	Taiwan	160,000	(Thailand) Rattanon Wannasrichan (1)	6	TWN
8 Aug	Aboitiz Invitational	Philippines	100,000	(Philippines) Juvic Pagunsan (2)	6	PHI
15 Aug	Northport Glenmarie Championship	Malaysia	RM200,000	(United States) Blake Snyder (1)	6	PGM
29 Aug	Ciputra Golf Tournament	Indonesia	100,000	(Vietnam) Michael Tran (1)	6	
13 Sep	Thongchai Jaidee Foundation	Thailand	฿4,000,000	(Thailand) Kiradech Aphibarnrat (1)	11	ATGT
19 Sep	Bukit Jawi Championship	Malaysia	RM200,000	(Malaysia) Danny Chia (3)	6	PGM
27 Sep	Ballantine's Taiwan Championship	Taiwan	110,000	(Thailand) Thammanoon Sriroj (1)	6	TWN
24 Oct	Kinrara Championship	Malaysia	RM200,000	(Thailand) Poom Saksansin (1)	6	PGM
31 Oct	TAKE Solutions India Masters	India	120,000	(India) S. Chikkarangappa (2)	6	PGTI
7 Nov	Tiara Championship	Malaysia	RM200,000	(United States) Casey O'Toole (1)	6	PGM
21 Nov	Nilai Springs Championship	Malaysia	RM200,000	(Thailand) Chanat Sakulpolphaisan (1)	6	PGM
28 Nov	MIDF KLGCC Championship	Malaysia	RM200,000	(Finland) Janne Kaske (2)	6	PGM
27 Dec	Boonchu Ruangkit Championship	Thailand	฿3,000,000	(Thailand) Phachara Khongwatmai (2)	14	ATGT

== Order of Merit ==
The Order of Merit was based on prize money won during the season, calculated in U.S. dollars. The top five players on the Order of Merit earned status to play on the 2016 Asian Tour.

Position	Player	Prize money ($)
1	(United States) Casey O'Toole	55,287
2	(Taiwan) Hsieh Chi-hsien	43,357
3	(New Zealand) Sean Riordan	40,782
4	(Australia) Jordan Sherratt	39,557
5	(Thailand) Phachara Khongwatmai	36,678
