= 2023 Professional Golf of Malaysia Tour =

Golf tour season

2023 Professional Golf of Malaysia Tour season
- Duration: 8 March 2023 – 18 November 2023
- Number of official events: 11
- Most wins: (Malaysia) Danny Chia (2)
- Order of Merit: (Malaysia) Ervin Chang

The 2023 Professional Golf of Malaysia Tour, titled as the 2023 Toyota Tour for sponsorship reasons, was the 11th season of the Professional Golf of Malaysia Tour, the main professional golf tour in Malaysia since it was formed in 2010.

== Toyota title sponsorship ==
In February, it was announced that the tour had signed a title sponsorship agreement with UMW Toyota Motor, being renamed as the Toyota Tour.

== Schedule ==
The following table lists official events during the 2023 season.

| Date | Tournament | Location | Purse (RM) | Winner (Note: The number in brackets after each winner's name is the number of Professional Golf of Malaysia Tour events they had won up to and including that tournament.) | OWGR points | Other tours (Note: ADT − Asian Development Tour.) |
|---|---|---|---|---|---|---|
| 11 Mar | Tun Ahmad Sarji Trophy | Selangor | 200,000 | (Malaysia) Danny Chia (12) | n/a | |
| 4 May | Mirai Cup | Sarawak | 180,000 | (Malaysia) Ervin Chang (1) | n/a | |
| 18 May | Hilux Cup | Sabah | 180,000 | (Malaysia) Nicholas Fung (20) | n/a | |
| 22 Jun | Vios Cup | Selangor | 180,000 | (Malaysia) Edven Ying (1) | n/a | |
| 13 Jul | Corolla Cup | Perak | 180,000 | (Malaysia) Danny Chia (13) | n/a | |
| 27 Jul | Supra Cup | Selangor | 180,000 | (Malaysia) Marcus Lim (a) (1) | n/a | |
| 10 Aug | Corolla Cross Cup | Selangor | 180,000 | (Malaysia) Gavin Green (7) | n/a | |
| 5 Oct | Camry Cup | Johor | 180,000 | (Malaysia) Daeng Abdul Rahman (1) | n/a | |
| 19 Oct | Alphard Cup | Negeri Sembilan | 180,000 | (Malaysia) Galven Green (1) | n/a | |
| 11 Nov | PKNS Selangor Masters | Selangor | US$175,000 | (Taiwan) Ho Yu-cheng (n/a) | 1.57 | ADT |
| 18 Nov | Toyota Tour Championship | Selangor | 350,000 | (Thailand) Suttinon Panyo (n/a) | 1.19 | ADT |

== Order of Merit ==
The Order of Merit was titled as the Toyota Tour Rankings and was based on prize money won during the season, calculated in Malaysian ringgit.

| Position | Player | Prize money (RM) |
|---|---|---|
| 1 | (Malaysia) Ervin Chang | 151,796 |
| 2 | (Malaysia) Galven Green | 99,520 |
| 3 | (Malaysia) Paul San | 99,337 |
| 4 | (Malaysia) Danny Chia | 83,870 |
| 5 | (Malaysia) Daeng Abdul Rahman | 70,042 |
