= Nicholas Fung =

Malaysian professional golfer (born 1990)

Personal information
- Full name: Nicholas Fung Chee Yung
- Nationality: Malaysia
- Born: 18 May 1990 (age 36)

Career
- Sport: Golf
- Turned professional: 2010
- Current tours: Asian Tour; Professional Golf of Malaysia Tour
- Former tours: Asian Development Tour; ASEAN PGA Tour
- Professional wins: 23

Number of wins by tour
- Asian Tour: 1
- Other: 22

Achievements and awards
- Professional Golf of Malaysia Tour Order of Merit winner: 2012, 2013, 2016
- ASEAN PGA Tour Order of Merit winner: 2012
- Asian Development Tour Order of Merit winner: 2013

Nicholas Fung Chee Yung (born 18 May 1990) is a Malaysian professional golfer.

== Asian Development Tour ==
Fung won the Order of Merit (money title) on the 2013 Asian Development Tour (ADT). He won ADT events in 2013, 2015 and 2017.

== Asian Tour ==
Fung has competed for multiple seasons on the Asian Tour. He captured his maiden title at the 2017 Queen's Cup, claiming a one-stroke victory over Jazz Janewattananond of Thailand. He also has three runner-up finishes – a tie for second at the 2013 Indonesia Open, a solo second at the 2015 World Classic Championship, and a tie for second at the 2016 Resorts World Manila Masters.

== International competition ==
Fung competed at the 2014 EurAsia Cup, the 2016 EurAsia Cup, and the 2016 World Cup of Golf.

== Amateur wins ==
- 2006 Brunei Amateur
- 2007 Vietnam Amateur, Kelantan Amateur

== Professional wins (23) ==
=== Asian Tour wins (1) ===
No.	Date	Tournament	Winning score	Margin of victory	Runner-up
1	18 Jun 2017	Queen’s Cup	−15 (66-68-68-67=269)	1 stroke	(Thailand) Jazz Janewattananond

Asian Tour playoff record (0–1)

No.	Year	Tournament	Opponents	Result
1	2016	Resorts World Manila Masters	(India) Shiv Chawrasia, (United States) Sam Chien	Chawrasia won with birdie on second extra hole Fung eliminated by birdie on first hole

=== Asian Development Tour wins (3) ===
No.	Date	Tournament	Winning score	Margin of victory	Runner(s)-up
1	29 Jun 2013	UMW Templer Park Masters^{1}	−10 (67-70-68-73=278)	1 stroke	(United States) Berry Henson
2	11 Apr 2015	Johor Championship^{1}	−27 (66-67-64-64=261)	11 strokes	(Malaysia) R. Nachimuthu, (Singapore) Lam Chih Bing
3	15 Apr 2017	UMW Championship^{1}	−12 (66-68-69-69=272)	Playoff	(Malaysia) Gavin Green, (Japan) Masaru Takahashi

^{1}Co-sanctioned by the Professional Golf of Malaysia Tour

=== ASEAN PGA Tour wins (2) ===
No.	Date	Tournament	Winning score	Margin of victory	Runner-up
1	2 Oct 2010	Mercedes-Benz Masters Vietnam	4 and 3		(Thailand) Panuphol Pittayarat
2	27 Oct 2012	Palembang Musi Championship	−18 (68-68-66-68=270)	2 strokes	(Thailand) Gunn Charoenkul

=== Professional Golf of Malaysia Tour wins (20) ===
No.	Date	Tournament	Winning score	Margin of victory	Runner(s)-up
1	28 Jul 2011	Sabah Classic	−4 (67-72-73-72=284)	2 strokes	(Malaysia) Danny Chia
2	8 Sep 2011	Sarawak Classic	−17 (69-67-67-68=271)	9 strokes	(Malaysia) Rashid Ismail, (Malaysia) R. Nachimuthu
3	20 Oct 2012	Negeri Sembilan Classic	−10 (72-67-70-69=278)	Playoff	(Malaysia) Iylia Jamil
4	22 Nov 2012	UMW Glenmarie Classic	−8 (71-70-70-69=280)	2 strokes	(Malaysia) Sukree Othman
5	29 Jun 2013	UMW Templer Park Masters^{1}	−10 (67-70-68-73=278)	1 stroke	(United States) Berry Henson
6	18 Aug 2013	I&P Group Championship	−19 (64-70-69-62=265)	11 strokes	(Malaysia) Arie Fauzi, (Malaysia) Khor Kheng Hwai, (Malaysia) Sukree Othman
7	28 Sep 2013	Melaka Classic	+3 (76-72-73-70=291)	1 stroke	(Malaysia) Zurie Harun
8	23 Nov 2013	Impian Classic	−15 (70-68-67-68=273)	Playoff	(Malaysia) Iylia Jamil
9	8 Mar 2014	Kelantan Championship	−12 (70-70-69-67=276)	3 strokes	(Malaysia) R. Nachimuthu, (Malaysia) M. Sasidaran
10	28 Feb 2015	Nilai Springs Championship	−11 (68-65-73-71=277)	6 strokes	(Malaysia) Kemarol Baharin
11	11 Apr 2015	Johor Championship^{1}	−27 (66-67-64-64=261)	11 strokes	(Malaysia) R. Nachimuthu, (Singapore) Lam Chih Bing
12	1 Aug 2015	Taiping Championship	−14 (70-67-70-67=274)	2 strokes	(Malaysia) Ben Leong
13	23 Jan 2016	I&P Group Championship (2)	−13 (65-69-66-67=267)	6 strokes	(Malaysia) Sukree Othman
14	23 Jan 2016	Kelantan Championship (2)	−17 (65-69-69-68=271)	4 strokes	(Malaysia) Khor Kheng Hwai
15	6 Aug 2016	I&P Match Play Championship	3 and 1		(Malaysia) Shaifubari Muda
16	15 Apr 2017	UMW Championship^{1}	−12 (66-68-69-69=272)	Playoff	(Malaysia) Gavin Green, (Japan) Masaru Takahashi
17	21 Jul 2022	Pahang Championship	−11 (68-69-68=205)	2 strokes	(Malaysia) Ervin Chang, (Malaysia) Sukree Othman
18	3 Nov 2022	Tiara Melaka Championship (2)	−9 (68-69-70=207)	1 stroke	(Malaysia) Shahriffuddin Ariffin
19	8 Dec 2022	Danau Championship	−5 (71-71-66=208)	Playoff	(Malaysia) Fakhrul Akmal
20	18 May 2023	Hilux Cup	−8 (72-70-66=208)	3 strokes	(Malaysia) Ben Leong, (Malaysia) Aretha Pan (a)

^{1}Co-sanctioned by the Asian Development Tour

== Team appearances ==
Professional

- World Cup (representing Malaysia): 2016
- EurAsia Cup (representing Asia): 2014 (tie), 2016, 2018
