= Berry Henson =

American professional golfer (born 1979)

Personal information
- Nickname: Hensonator
- Nationality: United States
- Born: July 4, 1979 (age 47) Thousand Oaks, California, U.S.
- Height: 5 ft 11 in (1.80 m)
- Weight: 165 lb (75 kg; 11.8 st)

Career
- Sport: Golf
- College: University of San Diego
- Turned professional: 2003
- Current tours: Asian Tour; Asian Development Tour
- Professional wins: 3

Number of wins by tour
- Asian Tour: 1
- Other: 2

Best results in major championships
- Masters Tournament: DNP
- PGA Championship: DNP
- U.S. Open: CUT: 2023
- The Open Championship: DNP

Berry Henson (born July 4, 1979) is an American professional golfer.

== Career ==
In 1979, Henson was born in Thousand Oaks, California. He played college golf at the University of San Diego.

In 2003, Henson turned professional. He began playing on the Asian Tour in 2011 and won the ICTSI Philippine Open.

== Professional wins (3) ==
=== Asian Tour wins (1) ===
No.	Date	Tournament	Winning score	Margin of victory	Runner-up
1	May 15, 2011	ICTSI Philippine Open	−5 (69-70-71-73=283)	1 stroke	(Philippines) Jay Bayron

=== Asian Development Tour wins (1) ===
No.	Date	Tournament	Winning score	Margin of victory	Runner-up
1	May 1, 2011	Clearwater Masters	−19 (65-70-66-68=269)	7 strokes	(Taiwan) Chang Tse-peng

=== Other wins (1) ===
No.	Date	Tournament	Winning score	Margin of victory	Runner-up
1	Jul 28, 2013	Long Beach Open	−19 (66-64-69-70=269)	3 strokes	(United States) Brett Lederer

== Results in major championships ==
Tournament	2023
Masters Tournament	
PGA Championship	
U.S. Open	CUT
The Open Championship	

Did not play

CUT = missed the half-way cut
