= 2016 EurAsia Cup =

- Dates: 15–17 January 2016
- Venue: Glenmarie Golf and Country Club
- Location: Shah Alam, Selangor, Malaysia
- Captains: Jeev Milkha Singh (Asia); Darren Clarke (Europe)
Asia	5½	18½	Europe
- Europe wins the EurAsia Cup

The 2016 EurAsia Cup presented by DRB-HICOM was the second edition of the EurAsia Cup, a team golf event contested between teams representing Asia and Europe. It was held from 15 to 17 January at the Glenmarie Golf and Country Club in Shah Alam, Selangor, Malaysia. The inaugural event in 2014 finished in a tie, and so the Cup was shared between the teams. For the 2016 edition, the team size was increased from 10 to 12 with a corresponding increase in the number of matches from 20 to 24.

The event had a $4,800,000 purse; $300,000 to each member of the winning team and $100,000 to each member of the losing team.

Europe comfortably won the match 18½ to 5½ and, in doing so, became the first winners of the trophy.

== Teams ==
Asia
Player	Country	Age	Money list ranks			OWGR	Previous appearances	Matches	W–L–H	Winning percentage
Player	Country	Age	Asian	Japan	Euro	OWGR	Previous appearances	Matches	W–L–H	Winning percentage
Jeev Milkha Singh	India	44	Non-playing captain							
Anirban Lahiri	India	28	1		20	43	1	3	2–1–0	66.67
Shiv Chawrasia	India	32	4		113	216	0	Rookie		
Thongchai Jaidee	Thailand	46	6		10	27	1	3	1–1–1	50.00
Danny Chia	Malaysia	43	8			253	0	Rookie		
An Byeong-hun	South Korea	24			7	29	0	Rookie		
Kiradech Aphibarnrat	Thailand	26			13	38	1	3	1–1–1	50.00
Kim Kyung-tae	South Korea	29		1		59	0	Rookie		
Shingo Katayama	Japan	42		5		58	0	Rookie		
Prayad Marksaeng	Thailand	49	10	20		98	1	3	1–1–1	50.00
Wu Ashun	China	30		44		170	0	Rookie		
Wang Jeung-hun	South Korea	20	9	69		171	0	Rookie		
Nicholas Fung	Malaysia	25	33			426	1	3	0–3–0	00.00

OWGR as of 11 January.
Yellow background indicates a captain's pick.

The Asian team was selected as follows: the leading four available Asian players from the 2015 Asian Tour Order of Merit as of 14 December, the leading four eligible and available Asian players from the Official World Golf Ranking as of 14 December, and four captain's picks. The leading four Asian players from the Asian Tour Order of Merit were Anirban Lahiri (1), Shiv Chawrasia (4), Thongchai Jaidee (6) and Danny Chia (8). The leading Asian players from the Official World Golf Ranking were Hideki Matsuyama (15), An Byeong-hun (28), Jaidee (29), Kiradech Aphibarnrat (37), Lahiri (41), Kim Kyung-tae (59) and Shingo Katayama (60). Matsuyama did not play while Jaidee and Lahiri had already qualified through their Asian Tour Order of Merit positions. The captain's picks were Nicholas Fung, Prayad Marksaeng, Wang Jeung-hun and Wu Ashun.

Europe
Player	Country	Age	Euro rank	OWGR	Previous appearances	Matches	W–L–H	Winning percentage
Darren Clarke	Northern Ireland	44	Non-playing captain					
Danny Willett	England	28	2	19	0	Rookie		
Shane Lowry	Ireland	28	5	21	0	Rookie		
Andy Sullivan	England	28	8	36	0	Rookie		
Bernd Wiesberger	Austria	30	9	33	0	Rookie		
Victor Dubuisson	France	25	11	32	1	3	1–2–0	33.33
Matt Fitzpatrick	England	21	12	44	0	Rookie		
Kristoffer Broberg	Sweden	29	14	65	0	Rookie		
Søren Kjeldsen	Denmark	40	15	47	0	Rookie		
Chris Wood	England	28	17	41	0	Rookie		
Ross Fisher	England	35	19	80	0	Rookie		
Lee Westwood	England	42	38	51	0	Rookie		
Ian Poulter	England	40	39	56	0	Rookie		

OWGR as of 11 January.
Yellow background indicates a captain's pick.

The European team was selected as follows: the leading 10 available European players from the final 2015 European Tour Race to Dubai rankings plus two captain's picks. The qualifiers from the Race to Dubai were Willett (2), Lowry (5), Sullivan (8), Wiesberger (9), Dubuisson (11), Fitzpatrick (12), Broberg (14), Kjeldsen (15), Wood (17), and Fisher (19); Rory McIlroy (1), Justin Rose (4), and Henrik Stenson (18) chose not to participate. Ian Poulter and Lee Westwood were chosen as captain picks.

== Schedule ==
- 15 January (Friday) Four-ball x 6
- 16 January (Saturday) Foursomes x 6
- 17 January (Sunday) Singles x 12

== Friday's matches (four-ball) ==
Asia	Results	Europe
Lahiri/Wang	4 & 3	Wiesberger/Poulter
An/Jaidee	3 & 1	Willett/Fitzpatrick
Chia/Fung	halved	Kjeldsen/Dubuisson
Kim/Marksaeng	6 & 4	Broberg/Fisher
Wu/Katayama	2 & 1	Sullivan/Lowry
Aphibarnrat/Chawrasia	2 & 1	Wood/Westwood
1½	Session	4½
1½	Overall	4½

== Saturday's matches (foursomes) ==
Asia	Results	Europe
An/Jaidee	3 & 2	Poulter/Willett
Kim/Wang	2 up	Wiesberger/Fisher
Chawrasia/Aphibarnrat	2 up	Broberg/Wood
Marksaeng/Katayama	3 & 2	Lowry/Sullivan
Chia/Fung	halved	Kjeldsen/Dubuisson
Lahiri/Wu	5 & 4	Westwood/Fitzpatrick
1½	Session	4½
3	Overall	9

== Sunday's matches (singles) ==
Asia	Results	Europe
Chia	4 & 3	Poulter
An	3 & 1	Willett
Jaidee	4 & 3	Sullivan
Aphibarnrat	2 up	Fitzpatrick
Lahiri	2 & 1	Lowry
Kim	3 & 2	Wiesberger
Fung	7 & 6	Westwood
Wang	halved	Fisher
Chawrasia	1 up	Wood
Katayama	5 & 4	Broberg
Wu	1 up	Dubuisson
Marksaeng	3 & 2	Kjeldsen
2½	Session	9½
5½	Overall	18½
