= Pavit Tangkamolprasert =

Thai golfer (born 1989)

Personal information
- Nationality: Thailand
- Born: 2 May 1989 (age 37)

Career
- Sport: Golf
- Turned professional: 2007
- Current tours: Asian Tour; All Thailand Golf Tour
- Former tours: Asian Development Tour; OneAsia Tour
- Professional wins: 14

Number of wins by tour
- Asian Tour: 3
- Other: 11

Achievements and awards
- Asian Development Tour Order of Merit winner: 2014
- All Thailand Golf Tour Order of Merit winner: 2020
- Asian Tour Order of Merit winner: 2026

Pavit Tangkamolprasert (Thai: ปวิธ ตั้งกมลประเสริฐ; born 2 May 1989) is a Thai professional golfer who plays on the European Tour and the Asian Tour where he has won three times. He also won the 2026 Asian Tour Order of Merit.

== Professional career ==
Tangkamolprasert's first win on the Asian Tour came in 2016 when he won the Venetian Macao Open after a playoff against Anirban Lahiri. In 2019, he won the Sabah Masters in a four-man playoff, chipping in at the second playoff hole. Two weeks before this he had lost in a playoff at the Thailand Open.

In 2014, he won the Asian Development Tour Order of Merit with three wins during the season.

In September 2026, he won Yeangder Tournament Players Championship by one stroke, his first Asian Tour victory after almost seven years. He went on to finish the season as the Order of Merit winner, also earning a European Tour for the 2027 season.

== Professional wins (14) ==
=== Asian Tour wins (3) ===
No.	Date	Tournament	Winning score	Margin of victory	Runner(s)-up
1	16 Oct 2016	Venetian Macao Open	−16 (69-67-68-64=268)	Playoff	(India) Anirban Lahiri
2	24 Nov 2019	Sabah Masters	−13 (73-66-67-65=271)	Playoff	(Australia) David Gleeson, (Thailand) Phachara Khongwatmai, (India) Aman Raj
3	20 Sep 2026	Yeangder Tournament Players Championship^{1}	−25 (64-66-67-66=263)	1 stroke	(Japan) Kazuki Higa

^{1}Co-sanctioned by the Taiwan PGA Tour

Asian Tour playoff record (2–1)

No.	Year	Tournament	Opponent(s)	Result
1	2016	Venetian Macao Open	(India) Anirban Lahiri	Won with birdie on first extra hole
2	2019	Thailand Open	(United States) John Catlin, (India) Shiv Kapur	Catlin won with birdie on first extra hole
3	2019	Sabah Masters	(Australia) David Gleeson, (Thailand) Phachara Khongwatmai, (India) Aman Raj	Won with birdie on second extra hole Raj eliminated by par on first hole

=== Asian Development Tour wins (8) ===
No.	Date	Tournament	Winning score	Margin of victory	Runner(s)-up
1	11 Jan 2014 (2013 season)	MIDF KLGCC Masters^{1}	−9 (69-66-70-70=275)	1 stroke	(Indonesia) George Gandranata, (Japan) Mitsuhiko Hashizume
2	17 Aug 2014	Terengganu Championship^{1}	−13 (65-70-70-66=271)	1 stroke	(Thailand) Pijit Petchkasem
3	13 Sep 2014	MNRB Sarawak Championship^{1}	−14 (69-69-67-69=274)	5 strokes	(Malaysia) Arie Irawan, (Thailand) Tirawat Kaewsiribandit
4	19 Oct 2014	ADT Chang Hwa Open^{2}	−13 (70-67-67-67=271)	4 strokes	(Republic of Ireland) Niall Turner
5	3 Apr 2016	Charming Yeangder ADT^{2}	−20 (69-66-66-67=268)	Playoff	(Taiwan) Lin Wen-tang
6	27 May 2018	Betagro Championship^{3}	−19 (71-67-62-69=269)	1 stroke	(Thailand) Sattaya Supupramai
7	26 Jan 2020	Boonchu Ruangkit Championship^{3}	−23 (69-62-63-67=261)	2 strokes	(United States) John Catlin
8	12 May 2024	Singha Laguna Phuket Open^{3}	−15 (64-66-68-67=265)	1 stroke	(Thailand) Itthipat Buranatanyarat, (Thailand) Phachara Khongwatmai, (Thailand) Varanyu Rattanaphiboonkij, (Thailand) Sarut Vongchaisit, (Thailand) Rattanon Wannasrichan

^{1}Co-sanctioned by the Professional Golf of Malaysia Tour
^{2}Co-sanctioned by the Taiwan PGA Tour
^{3}Co-sanctioned by the All Thailand Golf Tour

=== All Thailand Golf Tour wins (4) ===
No.	Date	Tournament	Winning score	Margin of victory	Runner(s)-up
1	2 Nov 2014	Singha Open	−21 (63-66-64-66=259)	4 strokes	(Thailand) Thitiphun Chuayprakong
2	27 May 2018	Betagro Championship^{1}	−19 (71-67-62-69=269)	1 stroke	(Thailand) Sattaya Supupramai
3	26 Jan 2020	Boonchu Ruangkit Championship^{1}	−23 (69-62-63-67=261)	2 strokes	(United States) John Catlin
4	12 May 2024	Singha Laguna Phuket Open^{1}	−15 (64-66-68-67=265)	1 stroke	(Thailand) Itthipat Buranatanyarat, (Thailand) Phachara Khongwatmai, (Thailand) Varanyu Rattanaphiboonkij, (Thailand) Sarut Vongchaisit, (Thailand) Rattanon Wannasrichan

^{1}Co-sanctioned by the Asian Development Tour

=== ASEAN PGA Tour wins (1) ===
No.	Date	Tournament	Winning score	Margin of victory	Runner-up
1	17 Nov 2012	Gowa Classic	−9 (73-70-67-69=279)	3 strokes	(Singapore) Choo Tze Huang

=== Thailand PGA Tour wins (1) ===
No.	Date	Tournament	Winning score	Margin of victory	Runner-up
1	9 Aug 2020	Singha-SAT Prachinburi Championship	−13 (65-68-70=203)	Playoff	(Thailand) Naras Luangphetcharaporn
