= Jonathan Moore (golfer) =

American professional golfer (born 1985)

Personal information
- Nationality: United States
- Born: April 17, 1985 (age 41) Oceanside, California, U.S.
- Spouse: Claire

Career
- Sport: Golf
- College: Oklahoma State University
- Turned professional: 2007
- Current tour: Asian Tour
- Former tours: Asian Development Tour; Tarheel Tour
- Professional wins: 4

Best results in major championships
- Masters Tournament: DNP
- PGA Championship: DNP
- U.S. Open: CUT: 2006
- The Open Championship: CUT: 2015

Achievements and awards
- Asian Development Tour Order of Merit winner: 2011

Jonathan Moore (born April 17, 1985) is an American professional golfer and the current head men's golf coach at the University of Oklahoma.

== Career ==
Moore was born in Oceanside, California. He enjoyed a high-profile amateur career, culminating in winning the NCAA Championship and sealing the winning point in the 2007 Walker Cup, before he left Oklahoma State University early in order to turn professional.

After a couple of years on mini-tours, Moore has since established himself as a leading professional on the Asian Tour, finishing seventh in the 2012 Order of Merit.

Following his playing career, Moore transitioned into coaching and performance training, spending six years at Oklahoma State University as the assistant strength and conditioning coach for the Cowboys and Cowgirls golf programs while co-founding the school's Golf Research, Innovation and Performance (GRIP) Center. He joined University of Oklahoma as associate head coach and director of performance for the men’s golf program in 2023, helping lead the Sooners to multiple NCAA Regional titles and NCAA Championship appearances before being elevated to head coach beginning with the 2026–27 season.

== Amateur wins ==
- 2001 Oregon Amateur, Royal Oak Invitational, Western Junior, Robert Trent Jones Golf Trail Junior Championship, Ashworth Junior Classic
- 2006 Players Amateur, NCAA Championship

== Professional wins (4) ==
=== Asian Development Tour wins (1) ===
No.	Date	Tournament	Winning score	Margin of victory	Runner-up
1	May 8, 2011	CCM Impian Classic^{1}	−22 (68-66-65-67=266)	3 strokes	(Philippines) Artemio Murakami

^{1}Co-sanctioned by the Professional Golf of Malaysia Tour

=== NGA Hooters Tour wins (1) ===
- 2011 Falcons Fire

=== Tarheel Tour wins (1) ===
No.	Date	Tournament	Winning score	Margin of victory	Runner-up
1	May 23, 2008	Walnut Creek Classic	−14 (63-69-70=202)	Playoff	(United States) Kyle Gallo

=== Other wins (1) ===
- 2009 Coca-Cola Wal-Mart Open

== Results in major championships ==
Tournament	2006	2007	2008	2009	2010	2011	2012	2013	2014	2015
U.S. Open	CUT									
The Open Championship										CUT

Did not play

CUT = missed the half way cut
Note: Moore never played in the Masters Tournament or the PGA Championship.

== U.S. national team appearances ==
Amateur

- Eisenhower Trophy: 2006
- Palmer Cup: 2007 (winners)
- Walker Cup: 2007 (winners)
