= Ben Leong =

Malaysian professional golfer

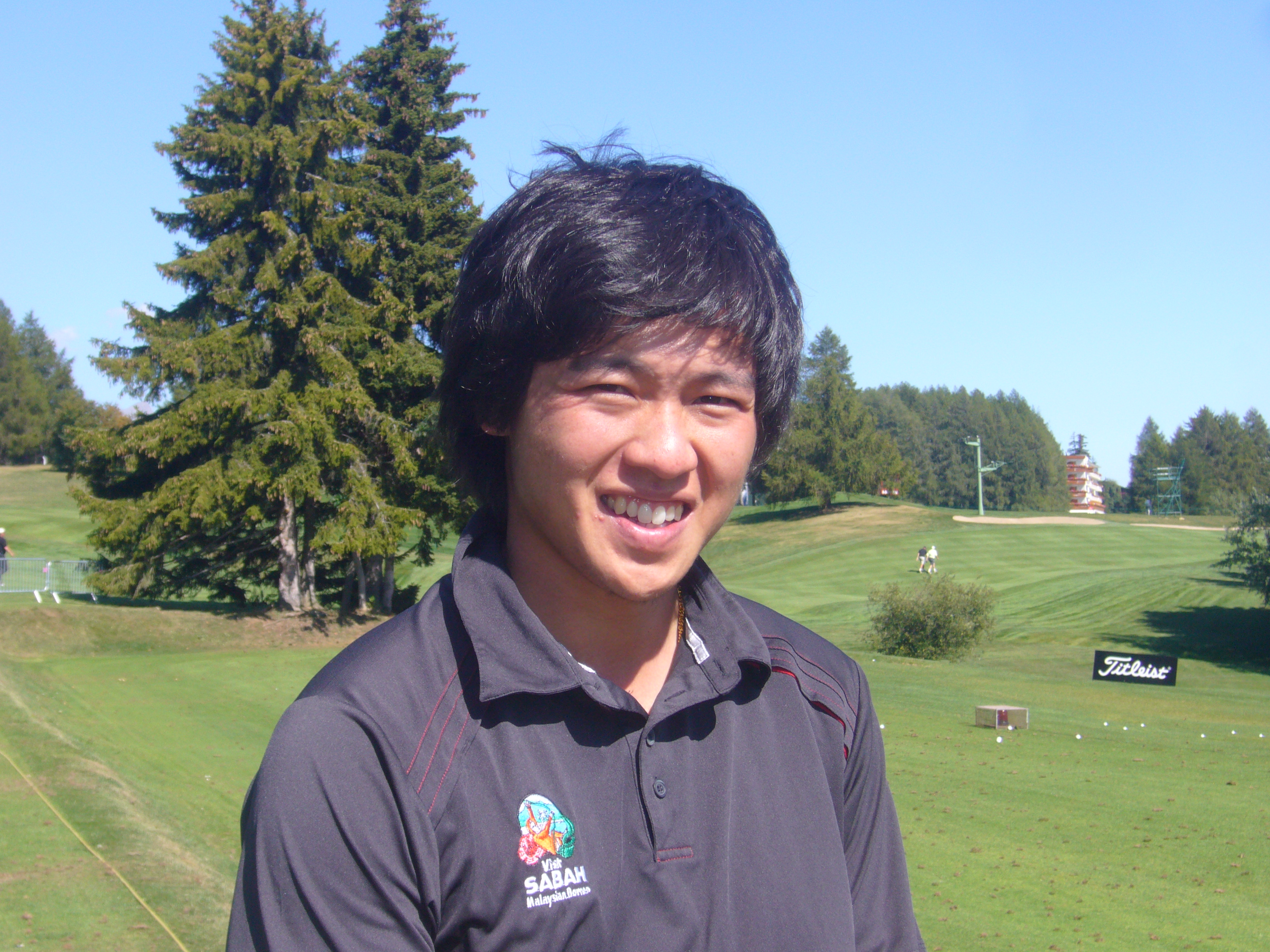

Personal information
- Nationality: Malaysia
- Born: 20 January 1986 (age 40)

Career
- Sport: Golf
- College: University of Central Florida
- Turned professional: 2006
- Current tours: Asian Tour; Professional Golf of Malaysia Tour
- Professional wins: 17

Number of wins by tour
- Asian Tour: 1
- Other: 16

Ben Leong (born 20 January 1986) is a Malaysian professional golfer.

== Career ==
Leong won the Asian Tour qualifying school in 2006, and after a poor debut season won again in 2007. His 2008 form was much improved, and he claimed his first tour win at the Worldwide Selangor Masters. Since then he has played on the Asian Tour full-time, with a best Order of Merit finish of 25th in 2008.

== Amateur wins ==
- 2003 Southeast Asia Amateur Championship
- 2005 Southeast Asia Amateur Championship

== Professional wins (17) ==
=== Asian Tour wins (1) ===
No.	Date	Tournament	Winning score	Margin of victory	Runner-up
1	10 Aug 2008	Worldwide Selangor Masters	−15 (71-65-64-69=269)	1 stroke	(Thailand) Thongchai Jaidee

=== Asian Development Tour wins (2) ===
No.	Date	Tournament	Winning score	Margin of victory	Runner-up
1	18 Mar 2017	Northport Championship^{1}	−20 (64-62-70=196) (Note: Shortened to 54 holes due to weather.)	7 strokes	(England) Steve Lewton
2	11 Aug 2018	Sabah Championship^{1}	−11 (69-69-70-69=277)	3 strokes	(United States) Sam Gillis

^{1}Co-sanctioned by the Professional Golf of Malaysia Tour

=== ASEAN PGA Tour wins (1) ===
No.	Date	Tournament	Winning score	Margin of victory	Runners-up
1	26 Jul 2008	Mercedes-Benz Masters Malaysia	−8 (72-68-68-72=280)	2 strokes	(Philippines) Michael Bibat, (Thailand) Varut Chomchalam, (Philippines) Artemio Murakami

=== Professional Golf of Malaysia Tour wins (14) ===
No.	Date	Tournament	Winning score	Margin of victory	Runner(s)-up
1	23 Aug 2014	I&P Group Championship	−6 (70-70-66-64=278)	1 stroke	(Malaysia) Shaifubari Muda
2	3 Oct 2015	Perlis Championship	−15 (69-68-68-68=273)	14 strokes	(Malaysia) R. Nachimuthu
3	30 Jul 2016	Impian Championship	−17 (69-67-71-64=271)	4 strokes	(Malaysia) R. Nachimuthu
4	22 Oct 2016	Orna Championship	−15 (70-66-69-68=273)	4 strokes	(Malaysia) Nicholas Fung
5	5 Nov 2016	PGM IGT Championship^{1}	−10 (66-68-72=206)	1 stroke	(Malaysia) Danny Chia, (Indonesia) Danny Masrin
6	12 Nov 2016	Tiara Melaka Championship	−20 (67-65-68-68=268)	20 strokes	(Malaysia) Sasidaran Muthiah
7	10 Dec 2016	Maybank Players Championship	−17 (64-64-65-74=267)	Playoff	(Malaysia) Gavin Green
8	7 Jan 2017	Sime Darby Impian Championship (2)	−15 (69-70-68-66=273)	2 strokes	(Malaysia) Shahriffuddin Ariffin
9	18 Mar 2017	Northport Championship^{2}	−20 (64-62-70=196)	7 strokes	(England) Steve Lewton
10	11 Aug 2018	Sabah Championship^{2}	−11 (69-69-70-69=277)	3 strokes	(United States) Sam Gillis
11	6 Jul 2019	Impian Championship (3)	−15 (68-69-65-71=273)	Playoff	(Malaysia) Nicholas Fung
12	27 Jun 2024	Fortuner Cup	−16 (63-66-65=194)	4 strokes	(Malaysia) Daeng Abdul Rahman, (Malaysia) Edven Ying
13	22 May 2025	KGPA Closed Championship	−13 (68-69-66=203)	3 strokes	(Malaysia) Nor Heikal Hadi
14	26 Jun 2025	Penang Closed Championship	−15 (69-65-67=201)	4 strokes	(Malaysia) Daeng Abdul Rahman

^{1}Co-sanctioned by the PGA Tour of Indonesia
^{2}Co-sanctioned by the Asian Development Tour

=== Other wins (1) ===
- 2008 Terengganu Masters

== Team appearances ==
Amateur

- Eisenhower Trophy (representing Malaysia): 2004, 2006
- Bonallack Trophy (representing Asia/Pacific): 2004 (winners), 2006

Professional

- World Cup (representing Malaysia): 2018
