= Johannes Veerman =

American professional golfer

Personal information
- Nationality: United States
- Born: May 17, 1992 (age 34) Orange County, California, U.S.
- Spouse: Angela
- Children: 1

Career
- Sport: Golf
- College: University of Tulsa; Texas A&M University
- Turned professional: 2015
- Current tour: European Tour
- Former tours: Asian Tour; Asian Development Tour
- Professional wins: 3

Number of wins by tour
- European Tour: 2
- Sunshine Tour: 1
- Other: 1

Best results in major championships
- Masters Tournament: DNP
- PGA Championship: DNP
- U.S. Open: CUT: 2021
- The Open Championship: T46: 2021

Achievements and awards
- Asian Development Tour Order of Merit winner: 2016

Johannes Veerman (born May 17, 1992) is an American professional golfer who plays on the European Tour and formerly the Asian Tour. He claimed his breakthrough win on the European Tour at the D+D Real Czech Masters in 2021. He followed that up with his second victory in December 2024, winning the Nedbank Golf Challenge at Gary Player Country Club.

== Early life ==
Veerman was born on May 17, 1992, in Orange County, California to a Dutch father and an Indonesian mother. Growing up he lived in many countries including the Philippines, Thailand, Malaysia, China and England.

== Professional career ==
Veerman turned professional in 2015. He played on the Asian Development Tour in 2016, achieving one victory at the Taifong Open. Later in the year, he finished tied-second at the Bank BRI-JCB Indonesia Open on the Asian Tour.

In 2017, Veerman finished second at the Yeangder Tournament Players Championship, one shot behind Ajeetesh Sandhu. In 2018, he recorded another runner-up finish at the Queen's Cup.

In 2019, Veerman earned a European Tour card for the 2020 season at the qualifying school. He recorded five top-10 finishes in his debut season; the best finish coming with a tied-for-fourth place at the Aphrodite Hills Cyprus Showdown. In 2021, he was contention to win at the Dubai Duty Free Irish Open, but late bogeys saw him ultimately finish in third place, four shots behind winner Lucas Herbert. This result however secured him a place in the 2021 Open Championship. A month later, Veerman won his first European Tour event at the D+D Real Czech Masters. He shot a final-round 68 to beat Sean Crocker and Tapio Pulkkanen by two shots.

In December 2024, Veerman won his second European Tour event at the Nedbank Golf Challenge in South Africa.

== Personal life ==
Veerman and his wife Angela have one son together.

== Professional wins (3) ==
=== European Tour wins (2) ===
| No. | Date | Tournament | Winning score | Margin of victory | Runners-up |
|---|---|---|---|---|---|
| 1 | Aug 22, 2021 | D+D Real Czech Masters | −15 (71-66-68-68=273) | 2 strokes | (United States) Sean Crocker, (Finland) Tapio Pulkkanen |
| 2 | Dec 8, 2024 (2025 season) | Nedbank Golf Challenge^{1} | −5 (70-71-73-69=283) | 1 stroke | (England) Matthew Jordan, (France) Romain Langasque, (South Africa) Aldrich Potgieter |

^{1}Co-sanctioned by the Sunshine Tour

=== Asian Development Tour wins (1) ===
| No. | Date | Tournament | Winning score | Margin of victory | Runner-up |
|---|---|---|---|---|---|
| 1 | Jul 9, 2016 | Taifong Open^{1} | −6 (70-70-70=210) (Note: Shortened to 54 holes due to weather.) | Playoff | (Taiwan) Chang Wei-lun |

^{1}Co-sanctioned by the Taiwan PGA Tour

== Results in major championships ==
| Tournament | 2021 |
|---|---|
| Masters Tournament | |
| PGA Championship | |
| U.S. Open | CUT |
| The Open Championship | T46 |

Did not play

CUT = missed the half-way cut
"T" = tied

== See also ==
- 2019 European Tour Qualifying School graduates
