= Airil Rizman =

Malaysian professional golfer

Personal information
- Full name: Airil Rizman Bin Zahari
- Nationality: Malaysia
- Born: 22 April 1978 (age 48) Kuala Lumpur, Malaysia

Career
- Sport: Golf
- Turned professional: 2002
- Current tours: Asian Development Tour; Professional Golf of Malaysia Tour
- Former tour: Asian Tour
- Professional wins: 10

Number of wins by tour
- Asian Tour: 1
- Other: 9

Achievements and awards
- Professional Golf of Malaysia Tour Order of Merit winner: 2014
Medal record
Southeast Asian Games
Silver medal – second place	2001 Kuala Lumpur	Men's team
Bronze medal – third place	2001 Kuala Lumpur	Individual

Airil Rizman, also known as Airil Rizman Zahari, (born 22 April 1978) is a Malaysian professional golfer.

== Early life and amateur career ==
In 1978, Rizman was born in Kuala Lumpur. He was the Malaysian Amateur in 1998, 1999 and 2001. He was a team gold medalist at the 2001 Southeast Asian Games.

== Professional career ==
Rizman won several titles on the Malaysian PGA Tour where he topped the order of merit in 2005. He first played on the Asian Tour in 2003, but did not have any top ten finishes through 2006. However, in 2007, he won the first event of the Asian Tour season, the Pakistan Open.

== Professional wins (10) ==
=== Asian Tour wins (1) ===
No.	Date	Tournament	Winning score	Margin of victory	Runner-up
1	21 Jan 2007	Pakistan Open	−19 (67-68-64-70=269)	2 strokes	(Australia) Scott Hend

=== Professional Golf of Malaysia Tour wins (9) ===
No.	Date	Tournament	Winning score	Margin of victory	Runner(s)-up
1	11 Feb 2012	Perlis Classic	+7 (75-72-73-75=295)	2 strokes	(Malaysia) Rashid Ismail, (Malaysia) Shaifubari Muda, (Malaysia) S. Siva Chandhran
2	14 Jul 2012	PNB Lanjut Classic	−12 (66-70-70-70=276)	1 stroke	(Malaysia) Akhmal Tarmizee
3	30 Aug 2012	Northport Templer Park Classic	−8 (68-68-69-75=280)	5 strokes	(Malaysia) Nicholas Fung
4	21 Jun 2014	Perlis Championship (2)	−6 (71-71-71-69=282)	5 strokes	(Malaysia) Rizal Amin
5	29 Nov 2014	Tiara Championship	−9 (72-71-68-68=279)	2 strokes	(Malaysia) Khor Kheng Hwai
6	25 Jul 2015	Swiss Garden Championship	−14 (68-70-69-67=274)	10 strokes	(Malaysia) Ben Leong, (Malaysia) Solomon Emilio Rosidin
7	5 Sep 2015	I&P Group Championship	−13 (66-72-65-68=271)	Playoff	(Malaysia) Nicholas Fung
8	15 Oct 2016	Terengganu Championship	−15 (75-72-65-67=279)	1 stroke	(Malaysia) Khor Kheng Hwai
9	14 Oct 2017	Miri Championship	−1 (72-73-70=215) (Note: Shortened to 54 holes due to weather.)	1 stroke	(Malaysia) Kenneth De Silva, (Malaysia) Shaifubari Muda, (Malaysia) Sukree Othman

== Team appearances ==
Amateur

- Eisenhower Trophy (representing Malaysia): 1998, 2000
- Bonallack Trophy (representing Asia/Pacific): 2000
