= Professional Golf of Malaysia Tour =

- Current season, competition or edition: 2026 Professional Golf of Malaysia Tour
- Formerly: Toyota Tour
- Sport: Golf
- Founded: 2010
- Founder: Tun Ahmad Sarji bin Abdul Hamid
- First season: 2011
- Commissioner: Tan Sri Hamad Kama Piah Che Othman
- Country: Based in Malaysia (Note: Schedules have also included events in Indonesia.)
- Most titles: Order of Merit titles: (Malaysia) Shahriffuddin Ariffin (3) (Malaysia) Nicholas Fung (3); Tournament wins: (Malaysia) Nicholas Fung (20)
- Website: https://pgmtourmalaysia.com

The Professional Golf of Malaysia Tour is the main professional golf tour in Malaysia.

== History ==
The tour was founded in 2010 by Tun Ahmad Sarji bin Abdul Hamid and was created in order to further advance professional golf in Malaysia. Many players from the Professional Golf of Malaysia Tour have progressed through the tour, eventually playing and winning on the Asian Tour. Notable players include Ben Leong, Nicholas Fung, Danny Chia, Airil Rizman and Gavin Green.

In 2023, the tour signed a sponsor title agreement with UMW Toyota Motor, being renamed as the Toyota Tour for the 2023 season onwards. The deal lasted until the end of the 2024 season.

== Order of Merit winners ==
Season	Winner	Prize money (RM)
2025	(Malaysia) Edven Ying	151,454
2024	(Malaysia) Paul San	121,686
2023	(Malaysia) Ervin Chang	151,796
2020–22	(Malaysia) Shahriffuddin Ariffin (3)	217,622
2019	(Malaysia) Amir Nazrin	151,791
2018	(Malaysia) Shahriffuddin Ariffin (2)	176,447
2017	(Malaysia) Shahriffuddin Ariffin	137,963
2016	(Malaysia) Nicholas Fung (3)	647,699
2015	(Malaysia) Danny Chia	771,373
2014	(Malaysia) Airil Rizman	178,922
2013	(Malaysia) Nicholas Fung (2)	221,311
2012	(Malaysia) Nicholas Fung	159,635
2011	(Malaysia) R. Nachimuthu	159,167
