= Asian Development Tour =

Professional golf tour in Asia

- Current season, competition or edition: 2026 Asian Development Tour
- Sport: Golf
- Founded: 2010
- Founder: Asian Tour
- First season: 2010
- CEO: Cho Minn Thant
- Countries: Based in Asia (Note: Schedules have also included events in Egypt and Morocco.)
- Most titles: Tournament wins: (Thailand) Pavit Tangkamolprasert (8)
- Related competitions: Asian Tour
- Website: https://asiantour.com/adt

The Asian Development Tour, founded in 2010, is a professional golf tour. It is the development tour for the Asian Tour. Players who fail to earn Asian Tour cards through qualifying school may play on the tour. Currently, the top ten players on the Order of Merit (money list) at the end of the year earn an Asian Tour card for the following season.

Beginning in 2013, tournaments were awarded Official World Golf Ranking points, with a minimum of six points to the winner and points to the top six plus ties. Most of the tournaments are played in Malaysia, Thailand, Taiwan and Indonesia, with tournaments in these being co-sanctioned with the Professional Golf of Malaysia Tour, the All Thailand Golf Tour, the Taiwan PGA Tour and the PGA Tour of Indonesia respectively.

For the 2014 season, the ADT changed its policy to award Asian Tour cards to the top five players on the Order of Merit, an increase from three in previous seasons. This was increased to seven for the 2018 season. For the 2020–22 season, the top ten were awarded Asian Tour cards for the following season.

== Order of Merit winners ==
Season	Winner	Prize money (US$)
2026	(Malaysia) Khavish Varadan	64,884
2025	(Thailand) Tawit Polthai	75,315
2024	(Thailand) Itthipat Buranatanyarat	66,897
2023	(Thailand) Denwit Boriboonsub	54,705
2020–22	(Thailand) Suteepat Prateeptienchai	86,449
2019	(Japan) Naoki Sekito	50,942
2018	(Argentina) Miguel Ángel Carballo	43,379
2017	(Thailand) Pannakorn Uthaipas	55,860
2016	(United States) Johannes Veerman	58,662
2015	(United States) Casey O'Toole	55,287
2014	(Thailand) Pavit Tangkamolprasert	68,975
2013	(Malaysia) Nicholas Fung	43,998
2012	(Philippines) Jay Bayron	34,310
2011	(United States) Jonathan Moore	29,580
2010	(Malaysia) S. Siva Chandhran	27,969
