= Hank Kuehne =

American professional golfer (born 1975)

Personal information
- Full name: Henry August Kuehne II
- Nationality: United States
- Born: September 11, 1975 (age 51) Dallas, Texas, U.S.
- Height: 6 ft 2 in (1.88 m)
- Weight: 205 lb (93 kg; 14.6 st)
- Children: 3

Career
- Sport: Golf
- College: Oklahoma State University; Southern Methodist University
- Turned professional: 1999
- Former tours: PGA Tour; Canadian Tour
- Professional wins: 4

Best results in major championships
- Masters Tournament: CUT: 1999
- PGA Championship: CUT: 2003
- U.S. Open: 65th: 1999
- The Open Championship: DNP

Achievements and awards
- Canadian Tour Order of Merit winner: 2002

Henry August Kuehne II (born September 11, 1975) is an American former U.S. Amateur champion and professional golfer who enjoyed some success on the PGA Tour.

== Early life ==
Kuehne was born in Dallas, Texas. His father started him playing golf at a young age. He has a sister (Kelli) who plays on the LPGA Tour, and a brother (Trip) who finished second to Tiger Woods in the 1994 U.S. Amateur and remains an amateur.

== Amateur career ==
Kuehne began his college career at Oklahoma State University, but later transferred to Southern Methodist University, where he earned All-American honors three times as a member of the golf team (third team in 1996, second team in 1998, and honorable mention in 1999). He won the 1998 U.S. Amateur and played on the 1998 U.S. Eisenhower Trophy team. He graduated from SMU in 1999 with a degree in communications.

== Professional career ==
In 1999, Kuehne turned professional. Although he has several professional wins in non-tour events, Kuehne's best finish on the PGA Tour has been a T-2 at both the 2003 Shell Houston Open and the 2005 John Deere Classic. His best result in a major is a 65th-place finish at the 1999 U.S. Open. In 2003, he won the Tour's Driving Distance title, unseating John Daly who had won eight consecutive titles and 11 in total.

Kuehne missed the cut at the 2012 Honda Classic, his first PGA Tour event since 2007. Lingering back problems prevented Kuehne from playing for five years.

== Personal life ==
Kuehne lives in Dallas, Texas and has three sons.

He was seen in public with tennis champion Venus Williams, whom he accompanied to the 2007 Wimbledon Championships and the 2007 U.S. Open. They broke up in 2010, after which Kuehne met his current wife Andy, whom he married in May 2011. Kuehne was initiated into Sigma Nu fraternity while at Oklahoma State University (Epsilon Epsilon chapter).

== Amateur wins ==
- 1998 U.S. Amateur

== Professional wins (4) ==
=== Canadian Tour wins (2) ===
No.	Date	Tournament	Winning score	Margin of victory	Runner(s)-up
1	Mar 17, 2002	Texas Challenge	−18 (72-68-65-65=270)	1 stroke	(United States) Jason Bohn, (United States) Steve Runge
2	Aug 11, 2002	Telus Quebec Open	−15 (68-67-69-69=273)	Playoff	(United States) Michael Harris

=== Other wins (2) ===
No.	Date	Tournament	Winning score	Margin of victory	Runners-up
1	Nov 16, 2003	Franklin Templeton Shootout (with (United States) Jeff Sluman)	−23 (65-58-60=193)	Playoff	(United States) Chad Campbell and (United States) Shaun Micheel, (United States) Brad Faxon and (United States) Scott McCarron
2	Nov 14, 2004	Franklin Templeton Shootout (2) (with (United States) Jeff Sluman)	−29 (64-62-61=187)	2 strokes	(United States) Steve Flesch and (United States) Justin Leonard

Other playoff record (1–0)

No.	Year	Tournament	Opponents	Result
1	2003	Franklin Templeton Shootout (with (United States) Jeff Sluman)	(United States) Chad Campbell and (United States) Shaun Micheel, (United States) Brad Faxon and (United States) Scott McCarron	Won with birdie on second extra hole

== Results in major championships ==
Tournament	1999	2000	2001	2002	2003
Masters Tournament	CUT				
U.S. Open	65LA				
PGA Championship					CUT

Did not play

LA = Low amateur
CUT = missed the half-way cut
Note: Kuehne never played in The Open Championship.

== U.S. national team appearances ==
Amateur

- Eisenhower Trophy: 1998
- Palmer Cup: 1998 (tie), 1999 (winners)

== See also ==
- Monday Night Golf
