= 2008 Players Championship =

Tournament information
- Dates: May 8–11, 2008
- Location: Ponte Vedra Beach, Florida; 30.198°N 81.394°W
- Course: TPC at Sawgrass
- Tour: PGA Tour

Statistics
- Par: 72
- Length: 7,215 yards (6,597 m)
- Field: 144 players, 74 after cut
- Cut: 147 (+3)
- Prize fund: $9.5 million
- Winner's share: $1.71 million

Champion
- (Spain) Sergio García
- 283 (−5), playoff

Location map
- Location in the United States Location in Florida

The 2008 Players Championship was a golf tournament in Florida on the PGA Tour, held May 8–11 at TPC Sawgrass in Ponte Vedra Beach, southeast of Jacksonville. It was the 35th Players Championship.

== Tournament summary ==
The event was won by Sergio García in a sudden-death playoff over Paul Goydos. Defending champion Phil Mickelson finished nine strokes back, in a tie for 21st place.

== Venue ==
This was the 27th Players Championship held at the TPC at Sawgrass Stadium Course and it remained at 7,215 yards (6,597 m).

=== Course layout ===
The 2008 Players Championship
Tee	Rating/Slope	1	2	3	4	5	6	7	8	9	Out	10	11	12	13	14	15	16	17	18	In	Total
Yards	n/a	423	532	177	384	471	393	442	237	583	3,642	424	558	358	181	481	449	523	137	462	3,573	7,215
Par		4	5	3	4	4	4	4	3	5	36	4	5	4	3	4	4	5	3	4	36	72

== Eligibility requirements ==
Winners of PGA Tour co-sponsored or approved tournaments, whose victories are considered official, since the previous year's Players Championship.

Zach Johnson, Rory Sabbatini, K. J. Choi, Woody Austin, Ángel Cabrera, Hunter Mahan, Brian Bateman, Jonathan Byrd, Pádraig Harrington, Joe Ogilvie, Jim Furyk, Steve Flesch, Brandt Snedeker, Steve Stricker, Phil Mickelson, Chad Campbell, Justin Leonard, George McNeill, Mike Weir, Daniel Chopra, Stephen Ames, D. J. Trahan, J. B. Holmes, Steve Lowery, Brian Gay, Ernie Els, Sean O'Hair, Geoff Ogilvy, Greg Kraft, Andrés Romero, Johnson Wagner, Boo Weekley, Adam Scott, Anthony Kim

The top 125 finishers on the 2007 Official PGA Tour Money List.

Vijay Singh, Scott Verplank, Mark Calcavecchia, Charles Howell III, Justin Rose, Tim Clark, John Rollins, Stewart Cink, Robert Allenby, Brett Wetterich, Luke Donald, Heath Slocum, David Toms, Carl Pettersson, Jerry Kelly, Ken Duke, John Senden, Henrik Stenson, Camilo Villegas, Nick Watney, Billy Mayfair, Stuart Appleby, Charley Hoffman, John Mallinger, Pat Perez, Lucas Glover, Bubba Watson, Mark Wilson, Jeff Quinney, Bo Van Pelt, Ryan Moore, Rod Pampling, Freddie Jacobson, Ian Poulter, Ryuji Imada, Nathan Green, Kevin Sutherland, Nick O'Hern, Vaughn Taylor, Brian Davis, José Cóceres, Troy Matteson, Robert Garrigus, Peter Lonard, Dean Wilson, Fred Funk, Paul Goydos, Kenny Perry, Steve Marino, Bart Bryant, Rocco Mediate, Bernhard Langer, Charlie Wi, Jason Gore, J. J. Henry, Jesper Parnevik, Charles Warren, Tim Petrovic, Retief Goosen, Michael Allen, Davis Love III, Stephen Leaney, Jeff Overton, Briny Baird, José María Olazábal, Mark Hensby, Mathew Goggin, Bill Haas, Shigeki Maruyama, Tim Herron, Chris DiMarco, Shaun Micheel, Tom Pernice Jr., Tommy Armour III, Steve Elkington, Cameron Beckman, Cliff Kresge, J. P. Hayes, Matt Kuchar, Tom Lehman, Bob Estes, Rich Beem, Alex Čejka, Ryan Armour, Kevin Na, Jeff Maggert, Kevin Stadler, Mathias Grönberg

Winners of the Players Championship, the Masters, U.S. Open, British Open, and PGA Championship from 2003 to 2007.

Michael Campbell, Ben Curtis, Todd Hamilton

Winners of the Tour Championship the past three years (2005-2007).

Winners of the World Golf Championships-Accenture Match Play Championship and World Golf Championships-CA Championship in the last three years (2006-2008).

Winners of the World Golf Championships-Bridgestone Invitational in the last three years (2005-2007).

Any player(s), not otherwise eligible, among the top 50 leaders from the Official World Golf Rankings through the Wachovia Championship. Any player(s), not otherwise eligible, among the top 10 leaders from the 2008 FedExCup Points List through the Wachovia Championship.

Sergio García, Lee Westwood, Niclas Fasth, Paul Casey, Richard Sterne, Miguel Ángel Jiménez, Søren Hansen

The winner of the 2007 Constellation Energy Senior Players Championship. (Such an exemption will be an addition to the field.)

The leading money winner from the 2007 Official Nationwide Tour Money List.

Richard Johnson

If necessary to complete a field of 144 players, PGA Tour members from the 2008 FedExCup Points List below 10th position through the Wachovia Championship, in order of their positions on such list.

Dudley Hart, John Merrick, Nicholas Thompson, Aaron Baddeley, Ben Crane, Brett Quigley, Fred Couples, Jason Bohn, Matt Jones, Tim Wilkinson, Dustin Johnson

== Round summaries ==
=== First round ===
Thursday, May 8, 2008

Place	Player	Score	To par
1	(Spain) Sergio García	66	−6
T2	(United States) Paul Goydos	68	−4
T2	(United States) Kenny Perry	68	−4
T4	(Australia) Steve Elkington	69	−3
T4	(Sweden) Niclas Fasth	69	−3
T4	(United States) Todd Hamilton	69	−3
T4	(England) Ian Poulter	69	−3
T4	(United States) Heath Slocum	69	−3
T9	(Argentina) Ángel Cabrera	70	−2
T9	(United States) Fred Couples	70	−2
T9	(United States) Ben Crane	70	−2
T9	(Spain) Miguel Ángel Jiménez	70	−2
T9	(United States) Anthony Kim	70	−2
T9	(United States) Troy Matteson	70	−2
T9	(United States) John Merrick	70	−2
T9	(United States) Phil Mickelson	70	−2
T9	(Spain) José María Olazábal	70	−2
T9	(United States) Brett Quigley	70	−2
T9	(United States) Kevin Stadler	70	−2
T9	(United States) Nicholas Thompson	70	−2
T9	(United States) D. J. Trahan	70	−2
T9	(United States) Boo Weekley	70	−2

=== Second round ===
Friday, May 9, 2008

Place	Player	Score	To par
1	(United States) Kenny Perry	68-70=138	−6
T2	(Spain) Sergio García	66-73=139	−5
T2	(United States) Paul Goydos	68-71=139	−5
T2	(Germany) Bernhard Langer	72-67=139	−5
5	(United States) Anthony Kim	70-70=140	−4
6	(United States) Boo Weekley	70-71=141	−3
T7	(Canada) Stephen Ames	74-68=142	−2
T7	(United States) Briny Baird	71-71=142	−2
T7	(United States) Fred Couples	70-72=142	−2
T7	(United States) Ben Crane	70-72=142	−2
T7	(United States) John Merrick	70-72=142	−2
T7	(United States) Kevin Stadler	70-72=142	−2

=== Third round ===
Saturday, May 10, 2008

Place	Player	Score	To par
1	(United States) Paul Goydos	68-71-70=209	−7
2	(United States) Kenny Perry	68-70-72=210	−6
3	(Spain) Sergio García	66-73-73=212	−4
T4	(Germany) Bernhard Langer	72-67-75=214	−2
T4	(United States) Phil Mickelson	70-73-71=214	−2
T4	(United States) Jeff Quinney	71-73-70=214	−2
T7	(Australia) Stuart Appleby	72-72-71=215	−1
T7	(United States) Briny Baird	71-71-73=215	−1
T7	(United States) J. B. Holmes	72-72-71=215	−1
T7	(United States) Greg Kraft	75-72-68=215	−1
T7	(United States) Tom Lehman	73-73-69=215	−1
T7	(United States) Tim Petrovic	73-73-69=215	−1
T7	(United States) Boo Weekley	70-71-74=215	−1

=== Final round ===
Sunday, May 11, 2008

In windy conditions, the final pairing struggled on the final day; overnight leader Paul Goydos managed a 2-over-par 74, whilst Kenny Perry crashed to an 81 (+9). In the groups ahead, the pairing of Jeff Quinney and Sergio García produced some of the best golf of the day, and García became the clubhouse leader at 5-under-par 283. Goydos still led, but missed a 15-foot (4.6 m) par putt to win on the final hole, forcing a sudden-death playoff.

Champion
(c) = past champion

Place	Player	Score	To par	Money ($)
T1	(Spain) Sergio García	66-73-73-71=283	−5	Playoff
T1	(United States) Paul Goydos	68-71-70-74=283	−5	Playoff
3	(United States) Jeff Quinney	71-73-70-70=284	−4	646,000
4	(United States) Briny Baird	71-71-73-72=287	−1	456,000
5	(Canada) Stephen Ames (c)	74-68-74-72=288	E	380,000
T6	(United States) Ben Crane	70-72-75-72=289	+1	307,562
T6	(South Africa) Ernie Els	72-71-74-72=289	+1	307,562
T6	(United States) Tom Lehman	73-73-69-74=289	+1	307,562
T6	(United States) Brett Quigley	70-76-72-71=289	+1	307,562
T10	(United States) Chad Campbell	73-72-77-68=290	+2	218,500
T10	(United States) J. B. Holmes	72-72-71-75=290	+2	218,500
T10	(United States) Greg Kraft	75-72-68-75=290	+2	218,500
T10	(Sweden) Henrik Stenson	73-71-75-71=290	+2	218,500
T10	(United States) Dean Wilson	74-72-75-69=290	+2	218,500

Leaderboard below the top 10
Place	Player	Score	To par	Money ($)
T15	(Australia) Stuart Appleby	72-72-71-76=291	+3	147,250
T15	(United States) Fred Couples (c)	70-72-77-72=291	+3	147,250
T15	(Germany) Bernhard Langer	72-67-75-77=291	+3	147,250
T15	(United States) Kenny Perry	68-70-72-81=291	+3	147,250
T15	(United States) Tim Petrovic	73-73-69-76=291	+3	147,250
T15	(United States) Kevin Stadler	70-72-78-71=291	+3	147,250
T21	(United States) Woody Austin	71-76-73-72=292	+4	95,000
T21	(United States) Stewart Cink	71-75-73-73=292	+4	95,000
T21	(United States) Phil Mickelson (c)	70-73-71-78=292	+4	95,000
T21	(England) Ian Poulter	69-74-73-76=292	+4	95,000
T21	(United States) Nicholas Thompson	70-77-71-74=292	+4	95,000
T21	(United States) Boo Weekley	70-71-74-77=292	+4	95,000
T27	(England) Luke Donald	75-72-74-72=293	+5	67,450
T27	(United States) Jim Furyk	74-72-71-76=293	+5	67,450
T27	(United States) John Merrick	70-72-77-74=293	+5	67,450
T27	(United States) Ryan Moore	72-74-73-74=293	+5	67,450
T27	(South Africa) Rory Sabbatini	73-71-75-74=293	+5	67,450
T32	(Australia) Aaron Baddeley	71-74-77-72=294	+6	48,260
T32	(United States) Jonathan Byrd	76-71-72-75=294	+6	48,260
T32	(Australia) Steve Elkington (c)	69-76-77-72=294	+6	48,260
T32	(United States) Brian Gay	72-74-75-73=294	+6	48,260
T32	(Sweden) Freddie Jacobson	76-70-70-78=294	+6	48,260
T32	(Spain) Miguel Ángel Jiménez	70-74-76-74=294	+6	48,260
T32	(United States) Jerry Kelly	74-72-70-78=294	+6	48,260
T32	(Australia) Nick O'Hern	73-74-75-72=294	+6	48,260
T32	(United States) David Toms	77-70-76-71=294	+6	48,260
T32	(Canada) Mike Weir	71-76-75-72=294	+6	48,260
T42	(Australia) Robert Allenby	74-71-77-73=295	+7	29,830
T42	(United States) Bart Bryant	73-71-79-72=295	+7	29,830
T42	(Sweden) Daniel Chopra	72-72-73-78=295	+7	29,830
T42	(United States) Ben Curtis	74-72-71-78=295	+7	29,830
T42	(Denmark) Søren Hansen	71-73-73-78=295	+7	29,830
T42	(United States) J. J. Henry	71-73-73-78=295	+7	29,830
T42	(United States) Anthony Kim	70-70-79-76=295	+7	29,830
T42	(United States) Pat Perez	72-74-72-77=295	+7	29,830
T42	(United States) Mark Wilson	76-71-72-76=295	+7	29,830
T51	(South Africa) Retief Goosen	73-71-77-75=296	+8	22,863
T51	(Sweden) Carl Pettersson	74-71-75-76=296	+8	22,863
T51	(United States) D. J. Trahan	70-77-75-74=296	+8	22,863
T54	(United States) Chris DiMarco	71-73-78-75=297	+9	21,280
T54	(United States) Ken Duke	72-75-76-74=297	+9	21,280
T54	(United States) Todd Hamilton	69-77-75-76=297	+9	21,280
T54	(United States) Davis Love III (c)	73-74-70-80=297	+9	21,280
T54	(United States) Rocco Mediate	74-72-72-79=297	+9	21,280
T54	(United States) Kevin Na	72-75-76-74=297	+9	21,280
T54	(Spain) José María Olazábal	70-75-80-72=297	+9	21,280
T54	(Australia) Adam Scott (c)	75-71-71-80=297	+9	21,280
T54	(United States) Johnson Wagner	72-74-77-74=297	+9	21,280
T63	(United States) Nick Watney	76-71-74-77=298	+10	20,235
T63	(South Korea) Charlie Wi	74-73-69-82=298	+10	20,235
65	(United States) Cliff Kresge	74-71-77-77=299	+11	19,950
T66	(Argentina) José Cóceres	72-75-71-82=300	+12	19,570
T66	(South Africa) Richard Sterne (golfer)	77-70-76-77=300	+12	19,570
T66	(Colombia) Camilo Villegas	74-73-77-76=300	+12	19,570
T69	(Sweden) Jesper Parnevik	72-74-70-85=301	+13	19,095
T69	(United States) Heath Slocum	69-76-78-78=301	+13	19,095
71	(United States) Jason Bohn	74-73-79-76=302	+14	18,810
72	(United States) Billy Mayfair	72-73-77-81=303	+15	18,620
T73	(United States) Tommy Armour III	71-76-80-80=307	+19	18,335
T73	(United States) Troy Matteson	70-76-80-81=307	+19	18,335
CUT	(Germany) Alex Čejka	72-76=148	+4	
CUT	(Sweden) Niclas Fasth	69-79=148	+4	
CUT	(United States) Sean O'Hair	75-73=148	+4	
CUT	(Australia) John Senden	76-72=148	+4	
CUT	(Fiji) Vijay Singh	75-73=148	+4	
CUT	(United States) Brandt Snedeker	72-76=148	+4	
CUT	(United States) Kevin Sutherland	73-75=148	+4	
CUT	(United States) Brian Bateman	74-75=149	+5	
CUT	(Australia) Mark Hensby	78-71=149	+5	
CUT	(Japan) Ryuji Imada	73-76=149	+5	
CUT	(United States) Justin Leonard (c)	75-74=149	+5	
CUT	(Australia) Rod Pampling	72-77=149	+5	
CUT	(United States) Scott Verplank	71-78=149	+5	
CUT	(United States) Bubba Watson	76-73=149	+5	
CUT	(New Zealand) Tim Wilkinson	77-72=149	+5	
CUT	(United States) Michael Allen	73-77=150	+6	
CUT	(United States) Steve Flesch	74-76=150	+6	
CUT	(Australia) Nathan Green	78-72=150	+6	
CUT	(Sweden) Mathias Grönberg	74-76=150	+6	
CUT	(Republic of Ireland) Pádraig Harrington	72-78=150	+6	
CUT	(Sweden) Richard S. Johnson	77-73=150	+6	
CUT	(Australia) Stephen Leaney	77-73=150	+6	
CUT	(United States) John Rollins	78-72=150	+6	
CUT	(Argentina) Ángel Cabrera	70-81=151	+7	
CUT	(United States) Mark Calcavecchia	76-75=151	+7	
CUT	(United States) Fred Funk (c)	74-77=151	+7	
CUT	(Australia) Mathew Goggin	74-77=151	+7	
CUT	(Australia) Peter Lonard	77-74=151	+7	
CUT	(United States) George McNeill	77-74=151	+7	
CUT	(United States) Joe Ogilvie	74-77=151	+7	
CUT	(England) Justin Rose	78-73=151	+7	
CUT	(England) Lee Westwood	73-78=151	+7	
CUT	(United States) Rich Beem	72-80=152	+8	
CUT	(New Zealand) Michael Campbell	74-78=152	+8	
CUT	(England) Brian Davis	77-75=152	+8	
CUT	(United States) Bob Estes	77-75=152	+8	
CUT	(United States) Dudley Hart	75-77=152	+8	
CUT	(Australia) Matt Jones	75-77=152	+8	
CUT	(United States) John Mallinger	75-77=152	+8	
CUT	(United States) Shaun Micheel	77-75=152	+8	
CUT	(Australia) Geoff Ogilvy	77-75=152	+8	
CUT	(England) Paul Casey	77-76=153	+9	
CUT	(United States) Bill Haas	76-77=153	+9	
CUT	(United States) Charles Howell III	79-74=153	+9	
CUT	(United States) Dustin Johnson	73-80=153	+9	
CUT	(United States) Matt Kuchar	78-75=153	+9	
CUT	(United States) Steve Lowery	77-76=153	+9	
CUT	(United States) Jeff Overton	74-79=153	+9	
CUT	(United States) Steve Stricker	77-76=153	+9	
CUT	(United States) Vaughn Taylor	78-75=153	+9	
CUT	(United States) Brett Wetterich	71-82=153	+9	
CUT	(United States) Tim Herron	73-81=154	+10	
CUT	(United States) Tom Pernice Jr.	75-79=154	+10	
CUT	(United States) Bo Van Pelt	74-80=154	+10	
CUT	(United States) Robert Garrigus	79-76=155	+11	
CUT	(United States) Zach Johnson	76-79=155	+11	
CUT	(United States) Steve Marino	77-79=156	+12	
CUT	(Argentina) Andrés Romero	77-79=156	+12	
CUT	(South Korea) K. J. Choi	79-78=157	+13	
CUT	(United States) J. P. Hayes	83-75=158	+14	
CUT	(South Africa) Tim Clark	77-82=159	+15	
CUT	(United States) Lucas Glover	80-79=159	+15	
CUT	(United States) Charley Hoffman	76-83=159	+15	
CUT	(United States) Charles Warren	77-82=159	+15	
WD	(United States) Jeff Maggert	72	E	
WD	(United States) Ryan Armour	81	+9	
WD	(Japan) Shigeki Maruyama	81	+9	
WD	(United States) Cameron Beckman			
WD	(United States) Jason Gore			
WD	(United States) Hunter Mahan			

==== Scorecard ====
Final round

Hole	1	2	3	4	5	6	7	8	9	10	11	12	13	14	15	16	17	18
Par	4	5	3	4	4	4	4	3	5	4	5	4	3	4	4	5	3	4
(Spain) García	−3	−3	−3	−3	−3	−3	−4	−3	−3	−3	−4	−5	−4	−5	−5	−5	−5	−5
(United States) Goydos	−7	−6	−5	−6	−5	−5	−5	−5	−5	−6	−6	−7	−7	−6	−5	−6	−6	−5
(United States) Quinney	−3	−4	−3	−3	−3	−3	−2	−2	−2	−2	−3	−3	−4	−4	−4	−5	−5	−4
(United States) Baird	−1	−1	−2	−2	−2	−2	−3	−3	−3	−3	−3	−3	−3	−3	−2	−2	−1	−1
(Canada) Ames	E	E	E	+2	+2	+2	+1	+1	E	−1	−1	−1	−1	−1	−2	−2	−2	E
(United States) Perry	−5	−5	−5	−4	−5	−5	−4	−4	−4	−3	−2	−2	−2	−2	+1	+1	+2	+3

Cumulative tournament scores, relative to par

Birdie	Bogey	Double bogey	Triple bogey+

==== Playoff ====
At the first playoff hole, the infamous par-3 17th, Goydos' went first and his tee shot found water. Garcia stayed dry, stopping 4 feet (1.2 m) from the pin and the playoff was essentially over. Goydos finished the hole with a double bogey to give Garcia three putts to win; he two-putted for par and the title. It was the first playoff at the Players Championship since 1987 and the first to start at the 17th hole.

Place	Player	Score	To par	Money ($)
1	(Spain) Sergio García	3	E	1,710,000
2	(United States) Paul Goydos	5	+2	1,026,000
