= Quebec Open =

Quebec Open may refer to any of the following sporting events:

- Quebec Open (darts), a darts tournament
- Quebec Open (golf), a golf tournament that was an event on the Canadian Tour until 1996
- Telus Open, a golf tournament that was an event on the Canadian Tour between 2000 and 2002, which was widely referred to as the "Telus Quebec Open" in its final year
