= 2001 Canadian Tour =

Golf tour season

2001 Canadian Tour season
- Duration: February 22, 2001 – September 23, 2001
- Number of official events: 15
- Most wins: (United States) Aaron Barber (2) (New Zealand) Paul Devenport (2) (United States) Ken Staton (2)
- Order of Merit: (United States) Aaron Barber

The 2001 Canadian Tour was the 16th season of the Canadian Tour, the main professional golf tour in Canada since it was formed in 1986.

== Schedule ==
The following table lists official events during the 2001 season.

Date	Tournament	Location	Purse (C$)	Winner (Note: The number in parentheses after each winner's name is the number of Canadian Tour events they had won up to and including that tournament.)	OWGR points
Feb 25	Myrtle Beach Open	United States	150,000	(Republic of Ireland) Eamonn Brady (1)	6
Mar 4	Barefoot Classic	United States	150,000	(United States) Aaron Barber (1)	6
Mar 11	South Carolina Challenge	United States	150,000	(United States) Jace Bugg (1)	6
Mar 18	CanAm Days Championship	United States	150,000	(United States) Scott Ford (1)	6
Jun 17	Shell Payless Open	British Columbia	150,000	(New Zealand) Paul Devenport (3)	6
Jun 24	Telus Vancouver Open	British Columbia	150,000	(United States) Steve Scott (1)	6
Jul 1	Telus Edmonton Open	Alberta	150,000	(United States) Aaron Barber (2)	6
Jul 15	MTS Classic	Manitoba	150,000	(United States) Ken Staton (4)	6
Jul 22	Ontario Open Heritage Classic	Ontario	150,000	(Canada) Craig Matthew (1)	6
Jul 29	Grant Forest Products NRCS Classic	Ontario	150,000	(United States) Derek Gilchrist (1)	6
Aug 12	Telus Open	Quebec	200,000	(New Zealand) Paul Devenport (4)	6
Aug 19	Eagle Creek Classic	Ontario	150,000	(United States) Mark Slawter (1)	6
Aug 26	Aliant Cup	Newfoundland and Labrador	150,000	(United States) Brian Payne (1)	6
Sep 16	Bayer Championship	Ontario	200,000	(United States) Jason Bohn (2)	6
Sep 23	Niagara Classic	Ontario	100,000	(United States) Ken Staton (5)	n/a

== Order of Merit ==
The Order of Merit was titled as the McDonald's Order of Merit and was based on prize money won during the season, calculated in Canadian dollars.

Position	Player	Prize money (C$)
1	(United States) Aaron Barber	75,337
2	(New Zealand) Paul Devenport	72,629
3	(United States) Jason Bohn	69,957
4	(United States) Jace Bugg	64,717
5	(United States) Mark Slawter	63,005
