= 2000 Canadian Tour =

Golf tour season

2000 Canadian Tour season
- Duration: May 25, 2000 – January 21, 2001
- Number of official events: 13
- Most wins: (New Zealand) Steven Alker (2)
- Order of Merit: (New Zealand) Steven Alker

The 2000 Canadian Tour was the 15th season of the Canadian Tour, the main professional golf tour in Canada since it was formed in 1986.

== Schedule ==
The following table lists official events during the 2000 season.

Date	Tournament	Location	Purse (C$)	Winner (Note: The number in parentheses after each winner's name is the number of Canadian Tour events they had won up to and including that tournament.)	OWGR points
May 28	Telus Vancouver Open	British Columbia	150,000	(Canada) Rob McMillan (2)	6
Jun 4	Shell Payless Open	British Columbia	150,000	(United States) Jason Bohn (1)	6
Jun 18	Telus Edmonton Open	Alberta	150,000	(New Zealand) Paul Devenport (2)	6
Jun 25	Telus Calgary Open	Alberta	150,000	(United States) Brian Kontak (2)	6
Jul 2	MTS Classic	Manitoba	125,000	(Australia) Ben Ferguson (1)	6
Jul 9	Ontario Open Heritage Classic	Ontario	125,000	(China) Zhang Lianwei (1)	6
Jul 16	Eagle Creek Classic	Ontario	125,000	(United States) Brian Unk (1)	6
Jul 23	QuebecTel Open	Quebec	125,000	(Canada) Philip Jonas (1)	6
Jul 30	Samsung Canadian PGA Championship	Ontario	150,000	(United States) Chad Wright (1)	6
Aug 6	Benefit Partners/NRCS Classic	Ontario	125,000	(Australia) Nathan Green (1)	6
Aug 27	McDonald's PEI Challenge	Prince Edward Island	125,000	(New Zealand) Steven Alker (1)	6
Sep 17	Bayer Championship	Ontario	200,000	(New Zealand) Steven Alker (2)	6
Jan 21	Panasonic Panama Open	Panama	US$200,000	(United States) Steve Runge (1)	6

== Order of Merit ==
The Order of Merit was titled as the McDonald's Order of Merit and was based on prize money won during the season, calculated in Canadian dollars.

Position	Player	Prize money (C$)
1	(New Zealand) Steven Alker	93,617
2	(United States) Arron Oberholser	73,356
3	(United States) Chad Wright	66,519
4	(Canada) Rob McMillan	65,812
5	(United States) Jason Bohn	65,049
