= 2002 Canadian Tour =

Golf tour season

2002 Canadian Tour season
- Duration: March 7, 2002 – August 18, 2002
- Number of official events: 16
- Most wins: (United States) Hank Kuehne (2) (United States) Jeff Quinney (2)
- Order of Merit: (United States) Hank Kuehne

The 2002 Canadian Tour was the 17th season of the Canadian Tour, the main professional golf tour in Canada since it was formed in 1986.

== Schedule ==
The following table lists official events during the 2002 season.

Date	Tournament	Location	Purse (C$)	Winner (Note: The number in parentheses after each winner's name is the number of Canadian Tour events they had won up to and including that tournament.)	OWGR points
Mar 10	Texas Classic	United States	225,000	(United States) Steve Scott (2)	6
Mar 17	Texas Challenge	United States	150,000	(United States) Hank Kuehne (1)	6
Mar 31	Scottsdale Swing at McCormick Ranch	United States	150,000	(United States) Jeff Quinney (1)	6
Apr 7	Scottsdale Swing at Eagle Mountain	United States	150,000	(United States) Jimmy Walker (1)	6
Apr 21	Michelin Ixtapa Intivational	Mexico	150,000	(Mexico) Pablo del Olmo (1)	6
Apr 28	Barefoot Classic	United States	150,000	(Canada) Rob McMillan (3)	6
May 5	Myrtle Beach Barefoot Championship	United States	150,000	(Canada) Derek Gillespie (1)	6
May 12	Lewis Chitengwa Memorial Championship	United States	150,000	(United States) Chris Wisler (1)	6
Jun 2	Bay Mills Open	United States	150,000	(United States) Jeff Quinney (2)	6
Jun 16	Ontario Open Heritage Classic	Ontario	150,000	(United States) Mike Grob (3)	6
Jun 30	Greater Vancouver Classic	British Columbia	150,000	(Malaysia) Iain Steel (1)	6
Jul 7	Victoria Open	British Columbia	150,000	(Australia) Scott Hend (1)	6
Jul 14	Telus Edmonton Open	Alberta	150,000	(Canada) Matt Daniel (1)	6
Jul 21	MTS Classic	Manitoba	150,000	(Mexico) Alex Quiroz (1)	6
Aug 11	Telus Quebec Open	Quebec	200,000	(United States) Hank Kuehne (2)	6
Aug 18	Greater Toronto Open	Ontario	150,000	(United States) Chris Locker (1)	6

=== Unofficial events ===
The following events were sanctioned by the Canadian Tour, but did not carry official money, nor were wins official.

Date	Tournament	Location	Purse (C$)	Winner	OWGR points
Jan 20	Panasonic Panama Open	Panama	US$225,000	(United States) Mario Tiziani	6

== Order of Merit ==
The Order of Merit was based on prize money won during the season, calculated in Canadian dollars.

Position	Player	Prize money (C$)
1	(United States) Hank Kuehne	105,959
2	(United States) Jeff Quinney	83,011
3	(Canada) Derek Gillespie	73,869
4	(United States) Steve Scott	72,855
5	(United States) Mike Grob	59,117
