= Paul Goydos =

American professional golfer (born 1964)

Personal information
- Full name: Paul David Goydos
- Nationality: United States
- Born: June 20, 1964 (age 62) Long Beach, California, U.S.
- Height: 5 ft 9 in (1.75 m)
- Weight: 190 lb (86 kg; 14 st)
- Children: Chelsea, Courtney

Career
- Sport: Golf
- College: Long Beach State University
- Turned professional: 1989
- Current tour: PGA Tour Champions
- Former tours: PGA Tour; Ben Hogan Tour
- Professional wins: 10
- Highest ranking: 39 (January 14, 2007)

Number of wins by tour
- PGA Tour: 2
- Korn Ferry Tour: 1
- PGA Tour Champions: 5

Best results in major championships
- Masters Tournament: CUT: 1996, 2007
- PGA Championship: T29: 1997
- U.S. Open: T12: 1999
- The Open Championship: 72nd: 2009

Paul David Goydos (born June 20, 1964) is an American professional golfer. He currently plays on the PGA Tour Champions. Goydos was a member of the PGA Tour. He won twice.

== Early life ==
Goydos was born and raised in Long Beach, California and is the youngest of three brothers. He began golfing at a very young age, winning his local course championship while still in junior high school.

Goydos attended Woodrow Wilson Classical High School.

== Amateur career ==
Goydos attended Long Beach State University. He earned a golf scholarship. Goydos graduated with a BA in finance.

After college, Goydos worked for a short time as a substitute teacher at an inner city high school.

== Professional career ==
In 1989, Goydos turned pro. He began his career on the mini-tours. He supplemented his income by continuing to work as a substitute teacher.

In 1990, he won the Long Beach Open, his first big breakthrough in his professional career. This allowed him to attend 1990 PGA Tour Qualifying School. He made the Finals and earned partially exempt status on the Ben Hogan Tour.

In 1991 and 1992, he played on the Ben Hogan Tour, earning one victory at the 1992 Ben Hogan Yuma Open. He earned his PGA Tour card for 1993 by going through 1992 PGA Tour Qualifying School.

Goydos won two PGA Tour events – the 1996 Bay Hill Invitational and the 2007 Sony Open in Hawaii. He has amassed more than 40 top-10 finishes and has more than $12 million in career earnings (on the PGA Tour). His best finish in a major was a T-12 at the 1999 U.S. Open.

Goydos had only two starts in 2004, both coming at the end of the year, because of sinus surgery and hip problems; he played in 2005 under a Major Medical Exemption. His victory at the Sony Open in Hawaii in 2007 elevated Goydos into the top 50 of the Official World Golf Ranking.

In 2008, Goydos lost in a playoff at The Players Championship to Sergio García when he put his tee shot on the par-3 17th (the first playoff hole) in the water.

During the first round of the 2010 John Deere Classic, Goydos became the fourth, and oldest player in PGA Tour history to shoot 59. His round included 12 birdies and 6 pars.

Goydos was selected by U.S. team captain Corey Pavin as one of his vice-captains for the 2010 Ryder Cup.

Goydos played in six events in 2012 before bone spurs in his left wrist and subsequent surgery forced him out of action for 15 months. He missed the cut in two events in 2013. He started the 2014 season on a Major Medical Extension, but was unable to satisfy the requirements and was demoted to the Past Champions category. At the same time, Goydos became eligible for the Champions Tour.

=== Senior career ===
On September 21, 2014, he earned his first Champions Tour victory in the Pacific Links Hawai'i Championship with a tournament record score of 19-under-par. He became the eighth player to win on all the PGA Tour sponsored major tours (PGA Tour, Korn Ferry Tour, and PGA Tour Champions).

On February 8, 2015, he won his second Champions Tour event, the Allianz Championship in Boca Raton, Florida. He finished his 2015 season with over 1 million dollars earned.

On July 10, 2016, he won his third PGA Tour Champions event, the Dick's Sporting Goods Open in Endicott, New York. He shot 67-66-69, to win by two shots over Wes Short Jr. The signature shot for the tournament was his drive of the sub-300 yard, par-4 16th hole, in which on Saturday, his drive landed less than 10 feet from the hole and he would make the putt for an eagle 2. With this victory, in addition to earning a $300,000 first prize check, vaulted him to collect over 15 million dollars from his combined earnings on the PGA Tour and PGA Tour Champions.

He won his fourth PGA Tour Champions event, the Charles Schwab Cup Championship by posting scores of 62-67-66 to hold off the late charges of Bernhard Langer and Colin Montgomerie. This win put him over the million dollar mark in earnings for the second consecutive year, and he finished the overall Charles Schwab Cup Championship points chase in third place.

At the end of July 2017, Goydos had two top-10 finishes to his credit for the season. During the first round of the 3M Championship, he shot a 2-under-par 70, but over the weekend, he had rounds of 60 (a course record) and 66 to finish at 20-under-par and in a tie with Gene Sauers. Then on the first playoff hole, Sauers hit his second shot in the water and had to take a drop. With Goydos safely on in two shots, he two-putted for a birdie and his fifth win on the PGA Tour Champions. For his last 37 holes played, he shot 19-under-par. By the end of 2017, he had earned $878,168 for the season; which was good enough to finish in the top 20 of the 2017 PGA Tour Champions Tour money list (19 place overall).

In the 2018 season, Goydos had a very solid year of performance which included seven top-10 finishes, amassing over 900,000 dollars earned, and finishing the Charles Schwab Cup standings in 12th place. As of the end of the 2018 season, he has earned just under five million dollars in his PGA Tour Champions career ($4,997,332).

His 2019 season produced very similar results to 2018, with a total of eight top-10 finishes, his highest being at the Regions Tradition (tied for second place), and earning just under 950,000 dollars for the season, to finish in the top 25 of the Charles Schwab Cup standings.

In 2020, he was limited to playing in only 11 events, however, two top-10 finishes late in the season at the Dominion Energy Charity Classic and the Charles Schwab Cup Championship allowed him to earn slightly over $300,000 for 2020. As this season also included the 2021 campaign, another top-ten finish at the Charles Schwab Cup Championship, put his total for the 2020–21 combined season at over one million dollars, and he finished the season in 29th overall place in the Charles Schwab Cup standings. In addition, his PGA Tour Champions career earnings as of end of 2021, were very slightly more the seven million dollars.

For the 2022 PGA Tour Champions season, Goydos continued playing at a constant level of success which included six top-10 finishes, highest being a tie for second at The TimberTech Championship, winnings of $868,875, (to bring his combined PGA Tour and PGA Tour Champions total earnings over $20 million), and finishing the season in the top-20 of the Charles Schwab Cup standings (17th overall). For his PGA Tour Champions career, he has earned $7,877,716. As of May 2026, he has won over 9.5 million dollars on the PGA Tour Champions.

== Awards and honors ==
- In 1996, Goydos was inducted into the inaugural class of the Long Beach Golf Hall of Fame.
- In 1996, he inducted into the Long Beach State 49ers Athletic Hall of Fame.
- The golf ball that was used when he shot 59 is at the World Golf Hall of Fame.

== Personal life ==
Goydos was married to Wendy. In 2005, they got divorced. They have two daughters: Chelsea and Courtney.

In 2009, his ex-wife, Wendy, died of a possible drug overdose (pending toxicology report) while attempting to treat migraines.

== Professional wins (10) ==
=== PGA Tour wins (2) ===
No.	Date	Tournament	Winning score	Margin of victory	Runner(s)-up
1	Mar 17, 1996	Bay Hill Invitational	−13 (67-74-67-67=275)	1 stroke	(United States) Jeff Maggert
2	Jan 14, 2007	Sony Open in Hawaii	−14 (66-63-70-67=266)	1 stroke	(England) Luke Donald, (United States) Charles Howell III

PGA Tour playoff record (0–1)

No.	Year	Tournament	Opponent	Result
1	2008	The Players Championship	(Spain) Sergio García	Lost to par on first extra hole

=== Ben Hogan Tour wins (1) ===
No.	Date	Tournament	Winning score	Margin of victory	Runners-up
1	Feb 16, 1992	Ben Hogan Yuma Open	−12 (68-65-68=201)	1 stroke	(United States) Jeff Coston, (United States) Taylor Smith

=== Other wins (2) ===
- 1990 Long Beach Open
- 1996 EA Sports Challenge Championship

=== PGA Tour Champions wins (5) ===
Legend
Charles Schwab Cup playoff events (1)
Other PGA Tour Champions (4)

No.	Date	Tournament	Winning score	Margin of victory	Runner(s)-up
1	Sep 21, 2014	Pacific Links Hawai'i Championship	−19 (66-63-68=197)	1 stroke	(United States) Scott Dunlap, (United States) Fred Funk
2	Feb 8, 2015	Allianz Championship	−12 (66-69-69=204)	1 stroke	(United States) Gene Sauers
3	Jul 10, 2016	Dick's Sporting Goods Open	−14 (67-66-69=202)	2 strokes	(United States) Wes Short Jr.
4	Nov 13, 2016	Charles Schwab Cup Championship	−15 (62-67-66=195)	2 strokes	(Germany) Bernhard Langer
5	Aug 6, 2017	3M Championship	−20 (70-60-66=196)	Playoff	(United States) Gene Sauers

PGA Tour Champions playoff record (1–0)

No.	Year	Tournament	Opponent	Result
1	2017	3M Championship	(United States) Gene Sauers	Won with birdie on first extra hole

== Results in major championships ==
Tournament	1994	1995	1996	1997	1998	1999
Masters Tournament			CUT			
U.S. Open	T44	T62	CUT	T28		T12
The Open Championship						
PGA Championship			T73	T29	T34	T31

Tournament	2000	2001	2002	2003	2004	2005	2006	2007	2008	2009	2010
Masters Tournament								CUT			
U.S. Open	CUT	CUT	CUT					CUT			CUT
The Open Championship									CUT	72	CUT
PGA Championship								CUT	T31	T67	CUT

Did not play

CUT = missed the halfway cut
"T" indicates a tie for a place.

=== Summary ===
Tournament	Wins	2nd	3rd	Top-5	Top-10	Top-25	Events	Cuts made
Masters Tournament	0	0	0	0	0	0	2	0
U.S. Open	0	0	0	0	0	1	10	4
The Open Championship	0	0	0	0	0	0	3	1
PGA Championship	0	0	0	0	0	0	8	6
Totals	0	0	0	0	0	1	23	11

- Most consecutive cuts made – 6 (1996 PGA – 1999 PGA)
- Longest streak of top-10s – 0

== Results in The Players Championship ==
Tournament	1994	1995	1996	1997	1998	1999	2000	2001	2002	2003	2004	2005	2006	2007	2008	2009	2010	2011
The Players Championship	T62	T49	CUT	CUT	T57	T38	CUT	T68						CUT	2	CUT	T52	3

Top 10
Did not play

CUT = missed the halfway cut
"T" indicates a tie for a place

== Results in World Golf Championships ==
Tournament	2007
Match Play	R64
Championship	T50
Invitational	T74

QF, R16, R32, R64 = Round in which player lost in match play
"T" = tied

== See also ==
- 1992 PGA Tour Qualifying School graduates
- 1993 PGA Tour Qualifying School graduates
- 2002 PGA Tour Qualifying School graduates
- Lowest rounds of golf
