= Tyco Golf Skills Challenge =

The ADT Skills Challenge was an offseason event in golf which tests golfers' abilities in putting, driving distance, and the short game (i.e. bunker shots and chip shots). Baseball superstar Mark McGwire beat out a field of professionals to win in 2003.

== Winners ==
Year	Winners	Earnings
2012	(Sweden) Peter Hanson and (England) Justin Rose	$285,000
2011	(United States) Zach Johnson and (United States) Jerry Kelly	$286,000
2010	(United States) Mark O'Meara and (Zimbabwe) Nick Price	$293,000
2009	(United States) Brandt Snedeker and (United States) Boo Weekley	$314,000
2008	(Australia) Greg Norman and (Australia) Greg Norman, Jr.	$290,000
2007	(United States) Natalie Gulbis and (United States) John Elway	$310,000
2006	(United States) Jason Gore and (United States) Dan Marino	$290,000
2005	(United States) Peter Jacobsen	$172,500
2004	(England) Nick Faldo	$125,467
2003	(United States) Mark McGwire	$122,500
2002	(United States) Matt Kuchar	$105,000
2001	(Fiji) Vijay Singh	$221,500
2000	(United States) Lee Janzen	$233,500
1999	(United States) Billy Andrade	$144,000
1998	(Zimbabwe) Nick Price	$126,000
1997	(United States) Billy Andrade	$136,000
1996	(United States) Brad Faxon	$80,000
1995	(United States) Brad Faxon	$92,000
1994	(South Africa) Gary Player	$88,000
1993	(United States) Peter Jacobsen	$78,000
1992	(United States) Peter Jacobsen	$107,000
