= First Tee Arkansas Classic =

Golf tournament

Tournament information
- Location: Hot Springs Village, Arkansas, U.S.
- Established: 2001
- Course: Diamante Golf Club
- Par: 72
- Tour: Nationwide Tour
- Format: Stroke play
- Prize fund: $500,000
- Month played: April
- Final year: 2005

Tournament record score
- Aggregate: 271 Jace Bugg (2002)
- To par: −17 as above

Final champion
- (Sweden) Daniel Chopra
- Location in the United States Location in Arkansas

The First Tee Arkansas Classic was a golf tournament on the Nationwide Tour. It was played from 2001 to 2004. It was played at Diamante Golf Club in Hot Springs Village, Arkansas.

In 2004 the winner earned $90,000.

== Winners ==
Year	Winner	Score	To par	Margin of victory	Runner-up
First Tee Arkansas Classic
2004	(Sweden) Daniel Chopra	275	−13	1 stroke	(United States) John Elliott
2003	(United States) Ted Purdy	275	−13	Playoff	(United States) Chris Tidland
Arkansas Classic
2002	(United States) Jace Bugg	271	−17	1 stroke	(United States) Jason Caron
Buy.com Arkansas Classic
2001	(United States) Brett Quigley	276	−12	3 strokes	(United States) John Elliott
