= Sergio García =

Spanish professional golfer (born 1980)

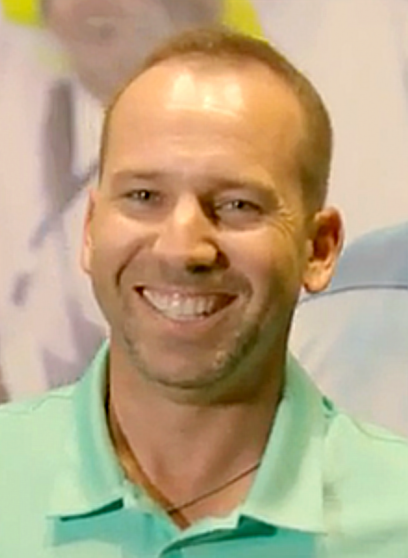
- García in 2017

Personal information
- Full name: Sergio García Fernández
- Nickname: El Niño
- Nationality: Spain
- Born: 9 January 1980 (age 46) Borriol, Castellón, Spain
- Height: 5 ft 10 in (178 cm)
- Weight: 180 lb (82 kg; 13 st)
- Spouse: Angela Akins (m. 2017)
- Children: 2

Career
- Sport: Golf
- Turned professional: 1999
- Current tours: Asian Tour; LIV Golf
- Former tours: PGA Tour; European Tour
- Professional wins: 38
- Highest ranking: 2 (9 November 2008)

Number of wins by tour
- PGA Tour: 11
- European Tour: 16
- Japan Golf Tour: 1
- Asian Tour: 5
- LIV Golf: 2
- Other: 5

Best results in major championships (wins: 1)
- Masters Tournament: Won: 2017
- PGA Championship: 2nd/T2: 1999, 2008
- U.S. Open: T3: 2005
- The Open Championship: 2nd/T2: 2007, 2014

Achievements and awards
- Sir Henry Cotton Rookie of the Year: 1999
- Byron Nelson Award: 2008
- Vardon Trophy: 2008
- European Tour Golfer of the Year: 2017

Sergio García Fernández (pronounced [ˈseɾxjo ɣaɾˈθi.a feɾˈnandeθ]; born 9 January 1980) is a Spanish professional golfer. He turned professional in 1999 and played on the European Tour and PGA Tour prior to joining the now defunct LIV Golf in 2022. García has won 36 international tournaments as a professional, most notably the 2008 Players Championship and the 2017 Masters Tournament. García was also the Chairman of Spanish football team CF Borriol.

García has spent much of his career in the top 10 of the Official World Golf Ranking, including over 300 weeks in the top 10 between 2000 and 2009, and over 450 weeks in the top 10 in total. He reached his highest career ranking, second, after winning the HSBC Champions tournament in November 2008. García has achieved career earnings of more than US$43 million. As a player, he is noted for strong iron play and accuracy. In the Ryder Cup, he competed in ten of the eleven matches playing during his professional career cumulatively earning a record 28.5 points during those matches.

== Early life and amateur career ==
García began playing golf at the age of three and was taught by his father, Victor, who is a club professional. García won his club championship at age 12.

At the age of 16, Garcia set a record as the youngest player to make the cut at a European Tour event, the 1995 Turespaña Open Mediterrania. In 1995, García became the youngest player to win the European Amateur. He followed that with a win in the Boys Amateur Championship in 1997. He won a professional tournament, the 1997 Catalan Open, as an amateur.

Garcia was part of the Spanish teams winning the European Boys' Team Championship in 1996 and 1997. In 1998, he won The Amateur Championship at Muirfield and reached the semi-finals of the U.S. Amateur. He also finished second in the 1998 Argentine Open, being the low amateur, and winning the Pereira Iraola Cup.

== Professional career ==
=== European Tour ===
In 1999, García turned professional. He shot the lowest amateur score in the 1999 Masters Tournament. His first title on the European Tour came in his sixth start as a professional, in July 1999 at the Irish Open. He first achieved worldwide prominence with a duel against Tiger Woods in the 1999 PGA Championship, where he eventually finished second, losing by one stroke. Late in the final round, García, with his ball up against a tree trunk in the right rough on the 16th hole, and the green hidden from view, swung hard with his eyes shut and hit a low curving fade that ran up onto the green. As the shot traveled, he sprinted madly into the fairway and then scissor-kick jumped to see the result. Shortly afterwards he became the youngest player ever to compete in the Ryder Cup. In 2002, during a practice round, García made an albatross (double eagle) on the par-5 second hole at the Masters, one of the few players to have ever done so. On the 575-yard (526 m) hole at the Augusta National Golf Club, he holed a 253-yard (231 m) 2-iron following a 325-yard (297 m) drive.

When García first turned professional, he had an unorthodox swing with a circular loop and long large lag, and this method drew comparisons to Ben Hogan, one of the best players of all time. But during the 2003 season, he worked towards making his swing more conventional, but has largely kept his original method. In his early years, he repeatedly gripped, released, and regripped his hands on the club handle before finally taking a shot. This "waggle" habit created a stir, especially at the 2002 U.S. Open when some spectators shouted out, "Hit the ball, Sergio!", and some people audibly counted the number of regrips into the twenties. Since then he has eliminated the habit. Responding to criticism of his swing, he said, "My swing works for me, so why should I change it? I prefer to have a natural swing and play well rather than a perfect swing and not be able to play good."

García was a member of every European Ryder Cup team from 1999 to 2021, with the exception of 2010, and has a career record at the Ryder Cup of 25–13–7 (.633). He has been in six winning sides and his singles win in 2018 made him the all-time Ryder Cup points leader, with 25 1/2 points in 9 appearances, overtaking Nick Faldo's 25 points in 11 appearances. By winning three of his four matches at Whistling Straits in 2021, he extended this record to 28 1/2 points, and also surpassed Faldo as the player with the most individual match victories, with 25.

In the 2006 Ryder Cup, at the K Club in Republic of Ireland, García won both his fourball and foursome matches (with José María Olazábal and Luke Donald, respectively) on day one, beating David Toms and Brett Wetterich in the fourballs and Tiger Woods and Jim Furyk in the foursomes. On day two, he paired up with Olazábal again, who won both their matches against Phil Mickelson and Chris DiMarco in both the foursomes and fourballs. Going into the final day in the singles, García was heavily tipped to be the second person to win all their matches in one Ryder Cup; however, Stewart Cink beat him 4 and 3. Europe won the cup again, with 18 1/2 points to the United States' 9 1/2 points. At the 2020 Ryder Cup, Garcia won the inaugural Nicklaus-Jacklin Award for the European team. It is an award given to the player whose teamwork, sportsmanship, performance and decisions epitomized the spirit of the Ryder Cup.

=== PGA Tour ===
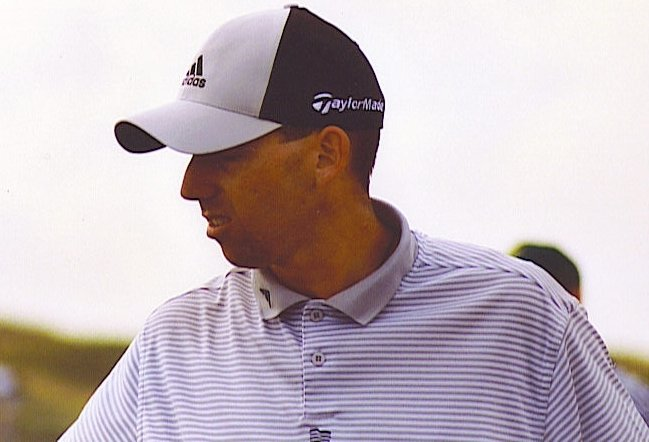
García in 2004

At the age of 21, García won his first PGA Tour event at the 2001 MasterCard Colonial in Fort Worth, Texas, and then won again at the Buick Classic in New York the same year. He was the youngest Tour winner since Tiger Woods in 1996 at age 20. In 2002, García won the Mercedes Championships in early January, and in 2004, he won the EDS Byron Nelson Championship and the Buick Classic for the second time. His sixth PGA Tour victory came at the 2005 Booz Allen Classic. As of October 2020, he has eleven PGA Tour victories, including the 2017 Masters Tournament. He also plays a limited schedule on the European Tour, where he has 16 tour level victories to his name.

In March 2007, García received criticism for a spitting incident at the WGC-CA Championship. During his third round García spat into the bottom of the cup on the 13th green after three-putting for bogey. After missing the cut in the first two major championships of 2007, García came close to winning The Open Championship – his favourite of the four majors – at Carnoustie Golf Links in Scotland. He held the lead after each one of the first three rounds and carried a three-shot lead over Steve Stricker and a six-shot lead over the rest of the field into the start of the fourth day.

At an early stage of the last round, García had extended his lead to four shots, but bogeys at the 5th, 7th, and 8th holes brought him back to the field. On the final challenging hole, he needed a par to win, but failed to get up and down from the greenside bunker. The last putt on the 18th hole on Sunday, from about 8 feet (2.4 m), would have given him his first professional major. He missed it by a fraction and faced a four-hole playoff with Pádraig Harrington that he eventually lost by one stroke.

In his post-round news conference, García seemed to suggest that bad breaks had cost him the Open championship. During the playoff, on the long par-3 16th hole, his tee shot hit the flagstick but then bounced 20 feet (6 m) from the pin, off the green, and García could not convert for birdie. "It's not the first time, unfortunately", he stated. "I don't know... I'm playing against a lot of guys out there, more than the field." In the 2007 PGA Championship, he was disqualified after signing an incorrect scorecard after the third round.

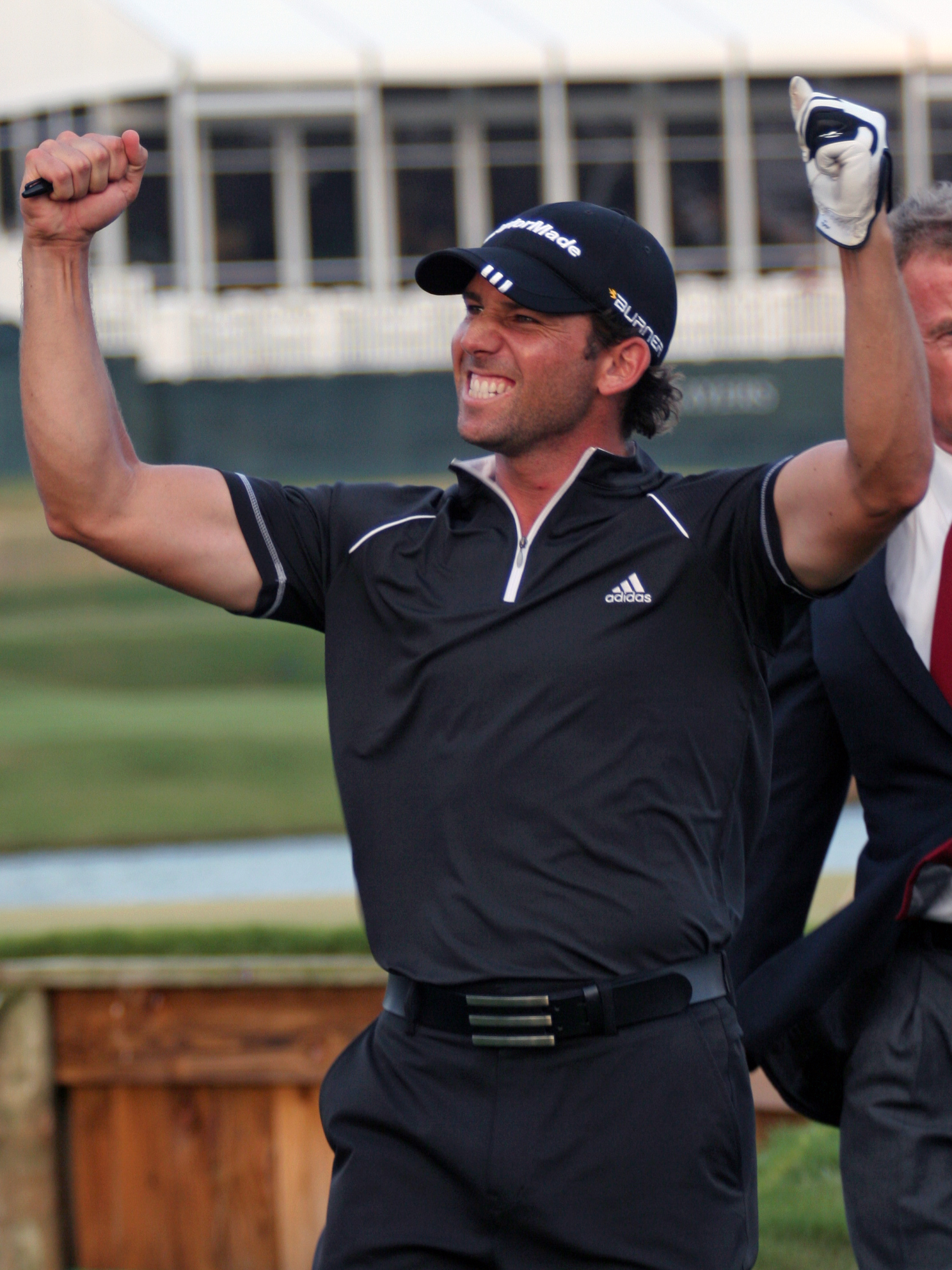
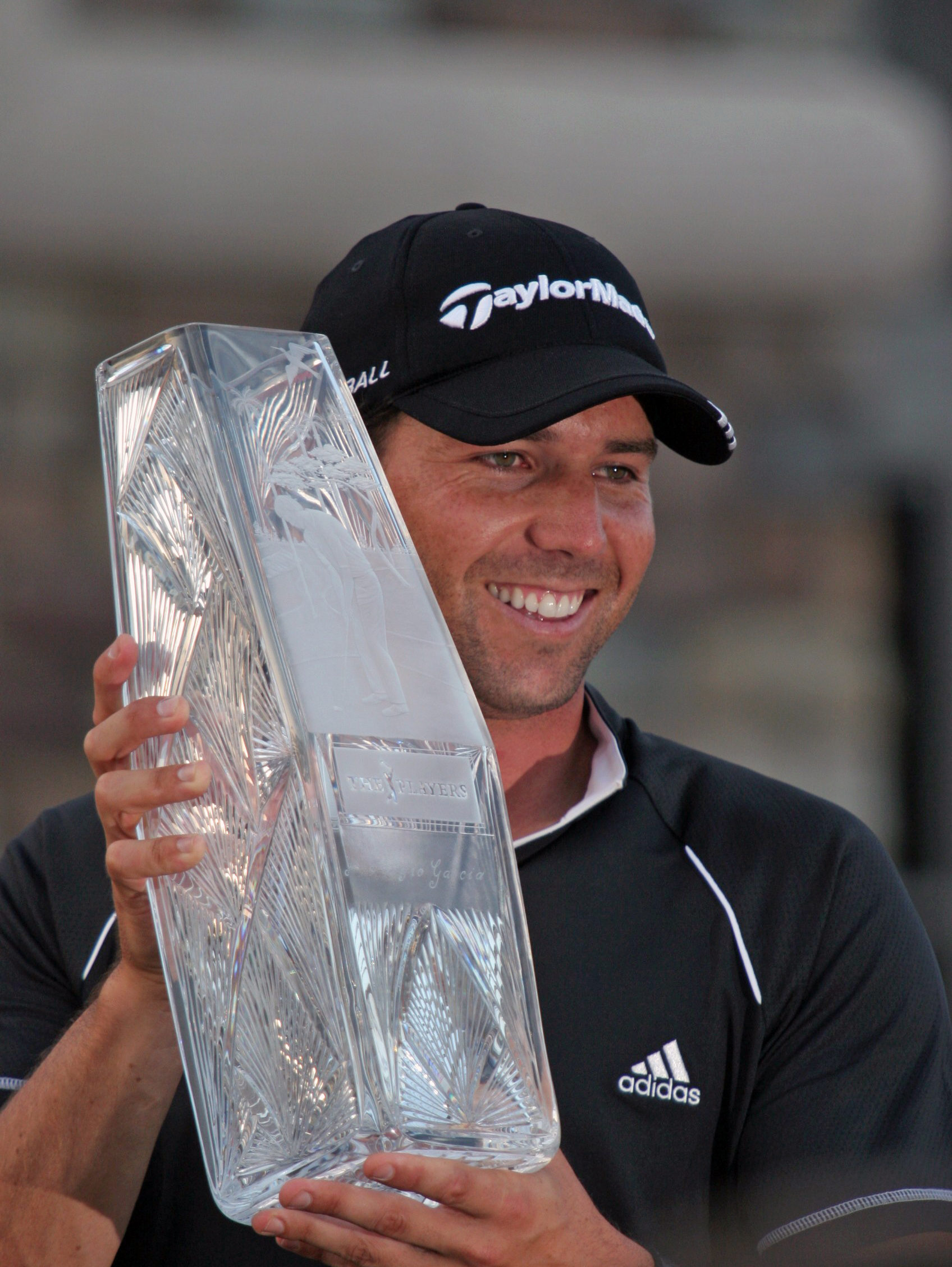
García's victory at the 2008 Players Championship

On 11 May 2008, García won The Players Championship on the PGA Tour in a sudden-death playoff against Paul Goydos. The playoff began at the par-3 17th, where Goydos hit a pitching wedge that ballooned and fell inches short of the island green and into the water, while García played a sand wedge to within four feet (1.3 m) of the hole. Goydos made double bogey while García made par for the win.

At the 2008 PGA Championship, played over the South Course of Oakland Hills Country Club near Detroit, García narrowly missed out on winning his first professional major championship yet again. Like at the 2007 Open Championship, Pádraig Harrington was able to erase a García lead on the back nine to take the title. García finished two strokes back for his second runner-up finish at the PGA Championship. His most serious mistake during the final round was misjudging his second shot on the 16th, playing into a strong wind, which found the water in front of the par-4 hole's green, costing him sole ownership of the lead. Regarding another near-miss in a major championship, García stated, "I felt like I responded well, and he was obviously very good on the back nine, and things just happened his way."

On 26 October 2008, he won his first European Tour title in over three years, at the first playing of the Castelló Masters Costa Azahar at his home course, the Club de Campo del Mediterráneo in Castellón, Spain. With this win, he rose to a career high of third in the Official World Golf Rankings. He dedicated the victory to compatriot Seve Ballesteros, who was recovering from multiple operations from the brain tumor that would ultimately claim Ballesteros' life. He won the 2008 HSBC Champions, the opening event on the 2009 European Tour season on 9 November 2008 in a playoff over Oliver Wilson. This win notched him up to a career high second in the Official World Golf Rankings, replacing Phil Mickelson in that spot, who had coincidentally won the HSBC Champions in 2007. García earned more money than any other golfer in 2008, earning $6,979,959 in 26 events.

After his success in 2008, García had a very disappointing season in 2009, rarely contending and finished ranked 74th on the PGA Tour money list. He had more success on the European Tour where he finished tenth in the inaugural Race to Dubai. His slump continued into 2010, and after missing the cut at the US PGA Championship, García announced he was taking a break from golf and would miss the 2010 Ryder Cup. He also dropped out of the top 50 of the Official World Golf Rankings. Struggles with the putter were the primary cause of his slump, since his ballstriking remained among the best in the world. On 29 August 2010, European captain Colin Montgomerie announced that García would be his fourth vice captain for the 2010 Ryder Cup at Celtic Manor.

García returned to competitive play in late 2010 with a new putting grip and this produced better results for him on the greens during tournaments in 2011. After 36 holes, he was near the lead in both the 2011 Transitions Championship and the 2011 Byron Nelson Championship, but both times faded on the weekend to fall out of contention.

García had to withdraw from qualifying for the 2011 Open Championship because of an infected finger. He had originally planned against qualifying for the 2011 U.S. Open, where he was outside the top-50 in the OWGR and was not guaranteed automatic entry. He eventually earned a spot in the U.S. Open after being one of the top four at a qualifying tournament near Memphis. García played well in all four rounds of the U.S. Open, ending in a tie for seventh place at five-under par 279. García finished tied for ninth place in The 2011 Open Championship at Royal St George's. This was his 17th career top-10 finish in a major.

In late June 2011, García almost broke his winless streak dating back to 2008, when he lost at the fifth sudden-death playoff hole to fellow Spaniard Pablo Larrazábal at the BMW International Open. García led the tournament after the 11th hole of the final round with a stunning stretch of holes, which saw him produce three birdies and two eagles in six holes, from holes six to eleven. However his charge to the finish was derailed by four bogeys in five holes, leaving him needing a birdie at the last to make the playoff. In the playoff, both players made consecutive birdies at the first two extra holes (both par 5s) before parring holes three and four (both par 3s). At the fifth extra hole, García had a 30-foot (9 m) eagle putt for the victory, but ran the effort four feet (1.3 m) past the hole. The resulting putt lipped out, allowing Larrazábal to hole a two-foot birdie putt for the victory.

García's runner-up finish at the BMW International Open ensured qualification for the 2011 Open Championship at Royal St George's, through the current form money list exemption. García went on to finish tied for 9th place at the Open Championship, his best finish for four years. He continued the run at the 2011 PGA Championship where he finished in a tie for 12th place, extending his streak to 50 consecutive majors played, the longest streak among active players. In October 2011, García ended a three-year title drought with back-to-back wins in his home country at the Castelló Masters and the Andalucía Masters. García won the Castelló Masters in dominant fashion, with a final score of 27-under-par, 11 strokes ahead of the field. It was the joint third highest victory margin on the European Tour, beaten only by Tiger Woods' 15 stroke victory at the 2000 U.S. Open and Ernie Els' 13 stroke win at the 2005 BMW Asian Open. After the win, García dedicated it to the late Seve Ballesteros, stating "That was for Seve."

The following week, García won the Andalucía Masters, played at the Club de Golf Valderrama, arguably regarded as one of the toughest golf courses on the European Tour. He edged out fellow countryman Miguel Ángel Jiménez by one shot after a tense final round. Following his back-to-back wins, García moved back into the top 20 of the Official World Golf Ranking. In August 2012, García ended a four-year title drought on the PGA Tour by winning the Wyndham Championship. In doing so, García also secured his place on the 2012 Ryder Cup team. In December 2012, García fired a final round 61 to win the Iskandar Johor Open on the Asian Tour.

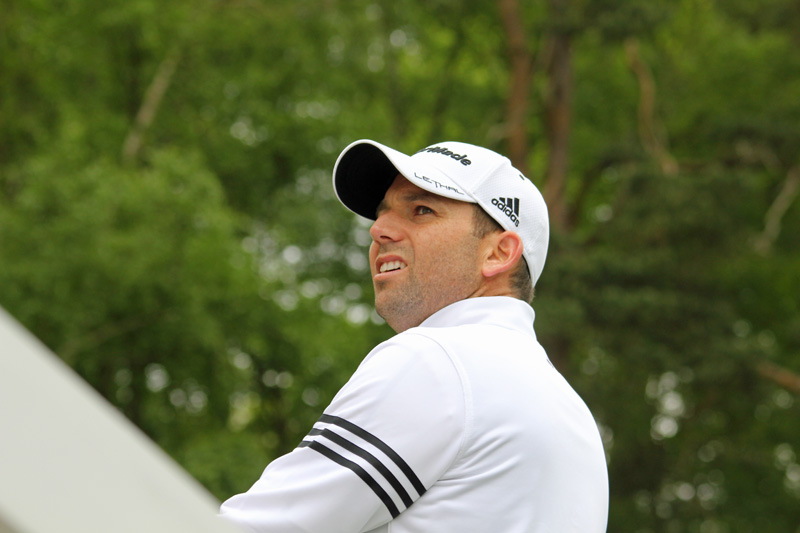
García at the 2013 BMW PGA Championship

While tied for the lead at the 2013 Players Championship, García hit three balls into the water on the 17th and 18th holes, finishing quadruple-bogey, double-bogey. He finished tied for eighth place. After the tournament ended, García and Tiger Woods (who won the tournament) had a public feud over an incident that occurred during the third round. Two weeks later, at a European Tour players dinner, García was asked about meeting with Woods at the U.S. Open, to which he responded, "We'll have him 'round every night. We will serve fried chicken." The remark was seen as racist. García issued a statement later that night apologizing and then issued another apology the next day, saying that his comments were "totally stupid and out of place".

In January 2014, García won the Commercial Bank Qatar Masters after defeating Mikko Ilonen in a playoff. The win put him back in the world top 10. In July 2014, García finished joint runner-up at the 2014 Open Championship, two strokes behind Rory McIlroy. This was the second time García had finished as a runner-up at The Open Championship and fourth time in a major championship, having still yet to break through. García began the final round seven strokes behind McIlroy, but got to within two after an eagle on the 10th hole. However his challenge was ended when he left his second shot in the bunker at the par three 15th which he would bogey to fall three behind with three to play. This finish moved García back inside the world's top five in the world rankings.

The biggest result of García's 2015 season was at the 2015 Players Championship; where he tied Rickie Fowler and Kevin Kisner at 12 under par after 72 holes. He was then eliminated after the three-hole playoff, after finishing two strokes behind Fowler and Kisner. Fowler would go on to win in sudden-death. On the Asian Tour, he won the Ho Tram Open in Phước Thuận, Vietnam, beating Lin Wen-tang, Himmat Rai and Thaworn Wiratchant in a four-way playoff.

As the year before at The Players Championship, García came very close to another win on the PGA Tour at The Honda Classic. In a final round showdown with Adam Scott, where the pair started the final round level, the Aussie prevailed by one shot. In May, García won his second AT&T Byron Nelson championship in a playoff over Brooks Koepka. The win was his first on the PGA Tour since 2012 and his ninth career victory, tying Seve Ballesteros for most by a Spanish-born player.

In February 2017, García completed a wire-to-wire victory at the Omega Dubai Desert Classic for his first European Tour title in over three years. The victory was García's 12th of his European Tour career, as he finished three strokes ahead of Henrik Stenson. The victory moved García back inside the top-10 and after the win García said "Hopefully it will be the beginning of a great year."

On 9 April 2017, in his 74th major championship, García broke through and won the Masters Tournament with victory on the first sudden-death playoff hole against Justin Rose. García became the third Spanish player to win the Masters, after Seve Ballesteros and José María Olazábal. The victory also came on what would have been Ballesteros' 60th birthday.

García shot rounds of 71-69-70 over the first three rounds to enter the final round at six-under par and in the co-lead with Rose, who played together in the final group. This represented García's second career 54-hole lead/co-lead at a major championship, after the 2007 Open Championship. García began the final round strongly, with two birdies on his opening three holes and he forged a three shot lead early on. Rose came back though and following bogeys on the 10th and 11th for García, Rose opened up a two shot lead.

The 13th hole was then pivotal, as García scrambled a par and Rose missed a short birdie putt to keep the gap at two shots. García would then birdie the next hole and eagle the par five 15th to tie Rose with three holes remaining. They then both hit their tee shots at the 16th close, but only Rose converted, to again lead by one. Rose however would make a mistake at the 17th, leading to a dropped shot and meaning both players were tied going up the 72nd hole. Both players hit their approach shots close on the 18th green, but Rose burnt the lip with his birdie putt. García had a five-foot putt to win the tournament in regulation play but missed it right resulting in a playoff as both players finished level on 9-under-par after 72 holes.

Playing the 18th hole again, Rose hit his tee shot into the pine straw, meaning his second shot was blocked off by trees, so could only advance his ball 50 yards or so. He played his third to a similar area of the green he had during regulation play. García fired his approach to within twelve feet. Rose's putt for par then missed on the left side of the hole, leaving García with two putts for the win. He only needed one, as he holed his birdie putt for his only major championship.

On 9 October 2017, it was announced that García had parted ways with TaylorMade after 15 years with the equipment brand.

Two weeks later, he won the Andalucía Valderrama Masters. Along with the Omega Dubai Desert Classic and the Masters, it was the first time he had recorded three wins in a single European Tour season. A few days after his win, he spoke about the rising tensions in Spain after the Catalan independence debate, calling on the country to 'be more together'.

Ahead of the season-ending DP World Tour Championship, Dubai in November, García dropped a huge hint that he was on the verge of signing an equipment deal with Callaway Golf Company after playing a full set of the brand's clubs in Dubai.

Following his three-win season, García was named European Tour Golfer of the Year in December.

On 21 January 2018, García played a bogey-free 27 holes to win the Asian Tour's SMBC Singapore Open by five strokes over Satoshi Kodaira and Shaun Norris. García shot four-under on the back nine to close out a third-round 66, then posted a closing three-under 68 in his final round.

On 5 April 2018, in the first round of the 2018 Masters Tournament, García tied the record for most strokes on a hole in Masters history, shooting a 13 on the 15th hole. García ultimately missed the cut at the 2018 Masters Tournament and failed to defend his title after shooting 81–78.

García was a member of the 2018 Ryder Cup winning European team at Le Golf National outside of Paris, France on 28–30 September 2018. He went 3–1–0 and won his singles match against Rickie Fowler (2 and 1). European captain Thomas Bjørn made García a captain's pick notwithstanding García's inconsistent play for much of 2018, but was chosen for his passion and record in the Ryder Cup.

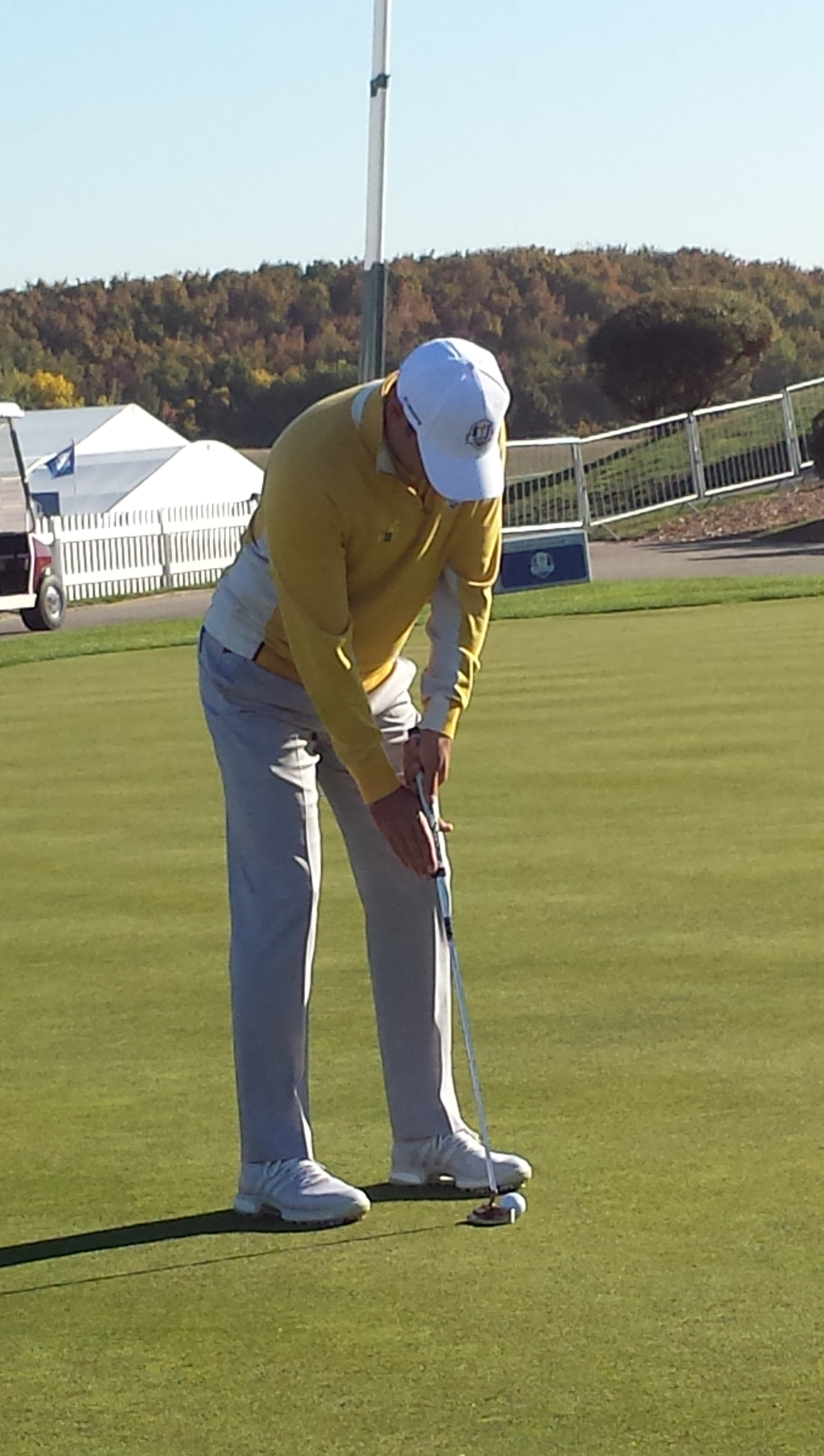
García at the 2018 Ryder Cup at Le Golf National outside Paris, France

On 22 October 2018, García successfully defended his Andalucía Valderrama Masters hosted by the Sergio García Foundation title after wrapping up a comfortable four-shot victory at Real Club Valderrama in Spain.

In February 2019, García was disqualified from the Saudi International tournament on the European Tour for damaging five greens deliberately in anger during his third round.

In March 2019, García was involved in another controversy at the WGC-Dell Technologies Match Play. García and Matt Kuchar were locked in a quarterfinal duel when things went awry at the par-3 seventh hole. Trailing Kuchar by one, García missed a seven-footer for par to win the hole, his ball coming to rest an inch or two away from the cup. García went after his putt and gave it a quick-rake, and the ball lipped out. Due to the Spaniard's swiftness, Kuchar did not have a chance to concede the putt. As a result, García lost the hole. Kuchar told the official he wanted to give García the putt, but that cannot be done retroactively. García eventually lost 2 up to Kuchar, who went on to play in the finals of the event.

In April 2019, García missed the cut at the Masters after shooting 73–75, which was won by Tiger Woods, and the missed cut was his 6th straight in a major championship, the longest such streak in his career.

In July 2019, García was again mired in controversy after throwing his driver at his caddie at the final round of the 2019 Open Championship after a poor drive at the fifth hole at Royal Portrush. Later that month, footage emerged of García gouging the teebox after a poor drive on the 16th hole, while competing at the WGC-FedEx St. Jude Invitational event in Memphis.

In September 2019, García won the KLM Open in Amsterdam with a one-shot win over teenage Danish golfer Nicolai Højgaard. This was his sixteenth European Tour win.

In January 2020, speaking ahead of the Abu Dhabi HSBC Championship, García revealed that he had ended his association with Callaway after just two years together.

In October 2020, García won the Sanderson Farms Championship in Mississippi. He has now won PGA Tour events in three separate decades.

Also in October 2020, it was announced that García would partner Amer Delić in a semi-professional doubles tournament to be held in Austin, Texas. The pair lost their opening match at the Men's UTR Pro Tennis event.

=== LIV Golf ===
In May, while competing at the Wells Fargo Championship on the PGA Tour, García had a verbal altercation with a rules official while attempting to find his ball. García became heated after being told it took too long to find his ball, leading to him shouting "A couple more weeks, and I won't have to deal with you anymore". This led to speculation that Garcia would join the Saudi Arabia-led LIV Golf Invitational Series. García resigned from the PGA Tour and was then suspended from its future tournaments after he began to play in the first LIV Golf tournament.

Having joined LIV, García was subject to fines and suspension from the European Tour for playing without a conflicting event release. After those sanctions were upheld by an independent arbitrator, in May 2023, the European Tour announced that he had resigned his membership of the tour.

== Personal life ==
In July 2017, García married Golf Channel reporter Angela Akins, the daughter of Marty Akins. His sister Mar is married to the footballer Pablo Hernández. Until June 2018, he was also the president and chairman of his hometown football club CF Borriol, for whom he occasionally played in the Tercera División. He maintains residences in Austin, Texas, Orlando, Florida, Borriol, and Crans-Montana.

In 2018, Akins and García had a daughter. They had son in 2020.

García is also an avid Real Madrid supporter and was invited to take the honorary kickoff for El Clásico (between Real and archrival FC Barcelona) at the Estadio Santiago Bernabéu wearing his green jacket after his Masters victory, in which Barcelona defeated leaders Real Madrid 3–2.

== Awards and honors ==
- In 1999, Garcia won the European Tour's Sir Henry Cotton Rookie of the Year award.
- In 2008, Garcia earned the Byron Nelson Award and Vardon Trophy. They are respectively bestowed by the PGA Tour and PGA of America, given to the player with the lowest scoring average over the course of the season.
- In 2017, he was given the European Tour Golfer of the Year award.

== Amateur wins ==
- 1995 European Young Masters, European Amateur
- 1997 Boys Amateur Championship, French Open Amateur Championship, Sherry Cup (Sotogrande)
- 1998 Spanish International Amateur Championship, The Amateur Championship

== Professional wins (38) ==
=== PGA Tour wins (11) ===
Legend
Major championships (1)
Players Championships (1)
Other PGA Tour (9)

No.	Date	Tournament	Winning score	Margin of victory	Runner(s)-up
1	20 May 2001	MasterCard Colonial	−13 (69-69-66-63=267)	2 strokes	(United States) Brian Gay, (United States) Phil Mickelson
2	25 Jun 2001	Buick Classic	−16 (68-67-66-67=268)	3 strokes	(United States) Scott Hoch
3	6 Jan 2002	Mercedes Championships	−18 (73-69-68-64=274)	Playoff	(United States) David Toms
4	16 May 2004	EDS Byron Nelson Championship	−10 (66-68-65-71=270)	Playoff	(United States) Robert Damron, (United States) Dudley Hart
5	13 Jun 2004	Buick Classic (2)	−12 (70-67-68-67=272)	Playoff	(Republic of Ireland) Pádraig Harrington, (South Africa) Rory Sabbatini
6	12 Jun 2005	Booz Allen Classic	−14 (71-68-66-65=270)	2 strokes	(United States) Ben Crane, (United States) Davis Love III, (Australia) Adam Scott
7	11 May 2008	The Players Championship	−5 (66-73-73-71=283)	Playoff	(United States) Paul Goydos
8	20 Aug 2012	Wyndham Championship	−18 (67-63-66-66=262)	2 strokes	(South Africa) Tim Clark
9	22 May 2016	AT&T Byron Nelson (2)	−15 (63-66-68-68=265)	Playoff	(United States) Brooks Koepka
10	9 Apr 2017	Masters Tournament	−9 (71-69-70-69=279)	Playoff	(England) Justin Rose
11	4 Oct 2020	Sanderson Farms Championship	−19 (68-68-66-67=269)	1 stroke	(United States) Peter Malnati

PGA Tour playoff record (6–6)

No.	Year	Tournament	Opponent(s)	Result
1	2001	The Tour Championship	(South Africa) Ernie Els, (United States) David Toms, (Canada) Mike Weir	Weir won with birdie on first extra hole
2	2002	Mercedes Championships	(United States) David Toms	Won with birdie on first extra hole
3	2004	EDS Byron Nelson Championship	(United States) Robert Damron, (United States) Dudley Hart	Won with par on first extra hole
4	2004	Buick Classic	(Republic of Ireland) Pádraig Harrington, (South Africa) Rory Sabbatini	Won with birdie on third extra hole Harrington eliminated by par on second hole
5	2005	Wachovia Championship	(United States) Jim Furyk, (Fiji) Vijay Singh	Singh won with par on fourth extra hole García eliminated by par on first hole
6	2007	The Open Championship	(Republic of Ireland) Pádraig Harrington	Lost four-hole aggregate playoff; Harrington: E (3-3-4-5=15), García: +1 (5-3-4-4=16)
7	2008	The Players Championship	(United States) Paul Goydos	Won with par on first extra hole
8	2008	The Barclays	(Fiji) Vijay Singh, (United States) Kevin Sutherland	Singh won with birdie on second extra hole Sutherland eliminated by birdie on first hole
9	2008	The Tour Championship	(Colombia) Camilo Villegas	Lost to par on first extra hole
10	2015	The Players Championship	(United States) Rickie Fowler, (United States) Kevin Kisner	Fowler won with birdie on first extra hole after three-hole aggregate playoff; Fowler: −1 (5-2-4=11), Kisner: −1 (5-2-4=11), García: +1 (5-3-5=13)
11	2016	AT&T Byron Nelson	(United States) Brooks Koepka	Won with par on first extra hole
12	2017	Masters Tournament	(England) Justin Rose	Won with birdie on first extra hole

=== European Tour wins (16) ===
Legend
Major championships (1)
Other European Tour (15)

No.	Date	Tournament	Winning score	Margin of victory	Runner(s)-up
1	4 Jul 1999	Murphy's Irish Open	−16 (69-68-67-64=268)	3 strokes	(Argentina) Ángel Cabrera
2	3 Oct 1999	Linde German Masters	−11 (68-69-72-68=277)	Playoff	(Republic of Ireland) Pádraig Harrington, (Wales) Ian Woosnam
3	23 Sep 2001	Trophée Lancôme	−18 (68-65-68-65=266)	1 stroke	(South Africa) Retief Goosen
4	28 Apr 2002	Canarias Open de España	−13 (67-68-67-73=275)	4 strokes	(Italy) Emanuele Canonica
5	17 Oct 2004	Mallorca Classic	−12 (66-67-68-67=268)	4 strokes	(England) Simon Khan
6	4 Sep 2005	Omega European Masters	−14 (66-65-71-68=270)	1 stroke	(Sweden) Peter Gustafsson
7	26 Oct 2008	Castelló Masters Costa Azahar	−20 (66-65-66-67=264)	3 strokes	(Sweden) Peter Hedblom
8	9 Nov 2008 (2009 season)	HSBC Champions^{1}	−14 (66-68-72-68=274)	Playoff	(England) Oliver Wilson
9	23 Oct 2011	Castelló Masters (2)	−27 (67-63-64-63=257)	11 strokes	(Spain) Gonzalo Fernández-Castaño
10	30 Oct 2011	Andalucía Masters	−6 (70-70-67-71=278)	1 stroke	(Spain) Miguel Ángel Jiménez
11	25 Jan 2014	Commercial Bank Qatar Masters	−16 (71-67-69-65=272)	Playoff	(Finland) Mikko Ilonen
12	5 Feb 2017	Omega Dubai Desert Classic	−19 (65-67-68-69=269)	3 strokes	(Sweden) Henrik Stenson
13	9 Apr 2017	Masters Tournament	−9 (71-69-70-69=279)	Playoff	(England) Justin Rose
14	22 Oct 2017	Andalucía Valderrama Masters (2)	−12 (66-71-68-67=272)	1 stroke	(Netherlands) Joost Luiten
15	22 Oct 2018	Andalucía Valderrama Masters (3)	−12 (68-64-69=201) (Note: Shortened to 54 holes due to weather.)	4 strokes	(Republic of Ireland) Shane Lowry
16	15 Sep 2019	KLM Open	−18 (68-67-66-69=270)	1 stroke	(Denmark) Nicolai Højgaard

^{1}Co-sanctioned by the Asian Tour, Sunshine Tour and PGA Tour of Australasia, but unofficial event on those tours.

European Tour playoff record (4–4)

No.	Year	Tournament	Opponent(s)	Result
1	1999	Linde German Masters	(Republic of Ireland) Pádraig Harrington, (Wales) Ian Woosnam	Won with birdie on second extra hole Woosnam eliminated by par on first hole
2	2001	Greg Norman Holden International	(Australia) Aaron Baddeley	Lost to birdie on first extra hole
3	2004	Volvo Masters Andalucía	(England) Ian Poulter	Lost to par on first extra hole
4	2007	The Open Championship	(Republic of Ireland) Pádraig Harrington	Lost four-hole aggregate playoff; Harrington: E (3-3-4-5=15), García: +1 (5-3-4-4=16)
5	2008	HSBC Champions	(England) Oliver Wilson	Won with birdie on second extra hole
6	2011	BMW International Open	(Spain) Pablo Larrazábal	Lost to birdie on fifth extra hole
7	2014	Commercial Bank Qatar Masters	(Finland) Mikko Ilonen	Won with birdie on third extra hole
8	2017	Masters Tournament	(England) Justin Rose	Won with birdie on first extra hole

=== Japan Golf Tour wins (1) ===
No.	Date	Tournament	Winning score	Margin of victory	Runners-up
1	21 Jan 2018	SMBC Singapore Open^{1}	−14 (66-70-66-68=270)	5 strokes	(Japan) Satoshi Kodaira, (South Africa) Shaun Norris

^{1}Co-sanctioned by the Asian Tour

Japan Golf Tour playoff record (0–1)

No.	Year	Tournament	Opponent	Result
1	1999	Dunlop Phoenix Tournament	(Denmark) Thomas Bjørn	Lost to birdie on fourth extra hole

=== Asian Tour wins (5) ===
Legend
Flagship events (1)
Other Asian Tour (4)

No.	Date	Tournament	Winning score	Margin of victory	Runner(s)-up
1	8 Sep 2002	Kolon Cup Korea Open^{1}	−23 (67-65-66-67=265)	3 strokes	(South Korea) Kang Wook-soon
2	16 Dec 2012	Iskandar Johor Open	−18 (68-69-61=198)	3 strokes	(United States) Jonathan Moore
3	15 Dec 2013	Thailand Golf Championship	−22 (68-65-65-68=266)	4 strokes	(Sweden) Henrik Stenson
4	6 Dec 2015	Ho Tram Open	−14 (66-68-68-68=270)	Playoff	(Taiwan) Lin Wen-tang, (India) Himmat Rai, (Thailand) Thaworn Wiratchant
5	21 Jan 2018	SMBC Singapore Open^{2}	−14 (66-70-66-68=270)	5 strokes	(Japan) Satoshi Kodaira, (South Africa) Shaun Norris

^{1}Co-sanctioned by the Korean Tour
^{2}Co-sanctioned by the Japan Golf Tour

Asian Tour playoff record (1–0)

No.	Year	Tournament	Opponents	Result
1	2015	Ho Tram Open	(Taiwan) Lin Wen-tang, (India) Himmat Rai, (Thailand) Thaworn Wiratchant	Won with par on second extra hole Lin and Wiratchant eliminated by birdie on first hole

=== LIV Golf League wins (2) ===
No.	Date	Tournament	Winning score	Margin of victory	Runner-up
1	14 Jul 2024	LIV Golf Andalucía	−5 (69-73-66=208)	Playoff	(India) Anirban Lahiri
2	9 Mar 2025	LIV Golf Hong Kong	−18 (65-64-63=192)	3 strokes	(South Africa) Dean Burmester

LIV Golf League playoff record (1–3)

No.	Year	Tournament	Opponent	Result
1	2023	LIV Golf Singapore	(United States) Talor Gooch	Lost to birdie on first extra hole
2	2024	LIV Golf Mayakoba	(Chile) Joaquín Niemann	Lost to birdie on fourth extra hole
3	2024	LIV Golf Miami	(South Africa) Dean Burmester	Lost to par on second extra hole
4	2024	LIV Golf Andalucía	(India) Anirban Lahiri	Won with par on second extra hole

=== Other wins (5) ===
No	Year	Tournament	Winning score	Margin of victory	Runner(s)-up
1	1997	Catalonian Open (as an amateur)			
2	2 Dec 2001	Nedbank Golf Challenge	−20 (68-71-66-63=268)	Playoff	(South Africa) Ernie Els
3	25 Jun 2002	Telus World Skins Game	$185,000	$95,000	(Fiji) Vijay Singh
4	30 Nov 2003	Nedbank Golf Challenge (2)	−14 (68-66-70-70=274)	Playoff	(South Africa) Retief Goosen
5	20 Nov 2010	Gary Player Invitational (with (United States) John Cook)	−14 (66-66=132)	1 stroke	(South Africa) Darren Fichardt and (South Africa) Bertus Smit

Other playoff record (2–0)

No.	Year	Tournament	Opponent	Result
1	2001	Nedbank Golf Challenge	(South Africa) Ernie Els	Won with birdie on first extra hole
2	2003	Nedbank Golf Challenge	(South Africa) Retief Goosen	Won with birdie on first extra hole

== Major championships ==
=== Wins (1) ===
Year	Championship	54 holes	Winning score	Margin	Runner-up
2017	Masters Tournament	Tied for lead	−9 (71-69-70-69=279)	Playoff^{1}	(England) Justin Rose

^{1}Defeated Rose in a sudden-death playoff: García (3), Rose (5).

=== Results timeline ===
Results not in chronological order in 2020.

Tournament	1996	1997	1998	1999
Masters Tournament				T38LA
U.S. Open				
The Open Championship	CUT		T29	CUT
PGA Championship				2

Tournament	2000	2001	2002	2003	2004	2005	2006	2007	2008	2009
Masters Tournament	T40	CUT	8	T28	T4	CUT	46	CUT	CUT	T38
U.S. Open	T46	T12	4	T35	T20	T3	CUT	CUT	T18	T10
The Open Championship	T36	T9	T8	T10	CUT	T5	T5	2	T51	T38
PGA Championship	T34	CUT	T10	CUT	CUT	T23	T3	DQ	T2	CUT

Tournament	2010	2011	2012	2013	2014	2015	2016	2017	2018
Masters Tournament	T45	T35	T12	T8	CUT	T17	T34	1	CUT
U.S. Open	T22	T7	T38	T45	T35	T18	T5	T21	CUT
The Open Championship	T14	T9	CUT	T21	T2	T6	T5	T37	CUT
PGA Championship	CUT	T12	CUT	T61	T35	T54	CUT	CUT	CUT

Tournament	2019	2020	2021	2022	2023	2024	2025	2026
Masters Tournament	CUT		CUT	T23	CUT	CUT	CUT	52
PGA Championship	CUT	CUT	CUT	CUT			T67	
U.S. Open	T52	CUT	T19	CUT	T27	T12		
The Open Championship	T67	NT	T19	T68			T34	

Win
Top 10
Did not play

LA = low amateur
CUT = missed the half way cut
"T" = tied
DQ = disqualified
NT = no tournament due to COVID-19 pandemic

=== Summary ===
Tournament	Wins	2nd	3rd	Top-5	Top-10	Top-25	Events	Cuts made
Masters Tournament	1	0	0	2	4	7	27	16
PGA Championship	0	2	1	3	4	6	25	11
U.S. Open	0	0	1	3	5	13	25	20
The Open Championship	0	2	0	5	10	13	26	21
Totals	1	4	2	13	23	39	103	68

- Most consecutive cuts made – 10 (2014 U.S. Open – 2016 Open)
- Longest streak of top-10s – 4 (2002 Masters – 2002 PGA)

== The Players Championship ==
=== Wins (1) ===
Year	Championship	54 holes	Winning score	Margin	Runner-up
2008	The Players Championship	3 shot deficit	−5 (66-73-73-71=283)	Playoff	(United States) Paul Goydos

=== Results timeline ===
Tournament	2000	2001	2002	2003	2004	2005	2006	2007	2008	2009
The Players Championship	CUT	T50	T4	CUT	T53	T32	T14	2	1	T22

Tournament	2010	2011	2012	2013	2014	2015	2016	2017	2018	2019
The Players Championship	T47	T12	T56	T8	3	T2	T54	T30	70	T22

Tournament	2020	2021	2022
The Players Championship	C	T9	T26

Win
Top 10

CUT = missed the halfway cut
"T" indicates a tie for a place
C = Cancelled after the first round due to the COVID-19 pandemic

== Results in World Golf Championships ==
Results not in chronological order before 2015.

Tournament	1999	2000	2001	2002	2003	2004	2005	2006	2007	2008	2009	2010	2011	2012	2013	2014	2015	2016	2017	2018	2019
Championship	T7	T5	NT^{1}	7	T12	T4	T3	T32	T3	T15	T31	T37		T60	T3	T16	T31	T11	T12	T7	T6
Match Play		R16		R16	R64	R64	R16		R32	R32	R64	4		R64	R32	R16	T34	T18	T30	R16	QF
Invitational	T7			T58	T30	T16	T13	T22	T20	T36	T22	T22	T53	T29	T40	2	T37		T39	T39	T40
Champions											T23				4	T28	T11	T9			T53

Tournament	2020	2021	2022
Championship	T37	T32	
Match Play	NT^{2}	QF	T26
Invitational	T35	T26	
Champions	NT^{2}	NT^{2}	NT^{2}

^{1}Cancelled due to 9/11
^{2}Cancelled due to COVID-19 pandemic

Top 10
Did not play

QF, R16, R32, R64 = Round in which player lost in match play
"T" = tied
NT = No tournament
Note that the HSBC Champions did not become a WGC event until 2009.
Note that the Championship and Invitational were discontinued from 2022.

== PGA and European Tour career summary ==
	PGA Tour			European Tour		
Season	Wins	Earnings (US$)	Rank	Wins	Earnings (€)	Rank
1999	0	784,917	53	2	1,317,693	3
2000	0	1,054,338	42	0	599,241	21
2001	2	2,898,635	6	1	715,288	27
2002	1	2,401,993	12	1	1,488,728	6
2003	0	666,386	95	0	496,521	49
2004	2	3,239,215	9	1	1,336,254	13
2005	1	3,213,375	10	1	1,828,545	6
2006	0	1,560,733	49	0	1,456,752	11
2007	0	3,721,185	9	0	1,228,267	15
2008	1	4,858,224	4	1	1,591,917	9
2009	0	1,212,522	74	1	1,660,788	10
2010	0	936,845	104	0	771,156	42
2011	0	1,524,091	54	2	1,962,723	8
2012	1	2,510,116	29	0	699,234	43
2013	0	2,251,139	26	0	1,280,581	16
2014	0	4,939,606	5	1	2,501,995	6
2015	0	2,670,229	31	0	1,048,814	31
2016	1	3,242,156	25	0	1,365,994	22
2017	1	3,522,476	18	3	3,184,582	2
2018	0	878,354	124	1	1,879,947	18
2019	0	1,793,027	61	1	1,516,474	21
2020	0	658,935	124	0	360,397	43
Career*	10	50,538,497	10	16	31,189,904	3

* As of 19 September 2020

These figures are from the respective tour's official sites. Note that there is double counting of money earned and wins in the majors and World Golf Championships.

== Team appearances ==
Amateur

- Jacques Léglise Trophy (representing the Continent of Europe): 1995, 1997 (winners)
- European Boys' Team Championship (representing Spain): 1995, 1996 (winners), 1997 (winners)
- European Amateur Team Championship (representing Spain): 1995, 1997 (winners)
- Junior Ryder Cup (representing Europe): 1995 (winners), 1997
- Eisenhower Trophy (representing Spain): 1996, 1998
- St Andrews Trophy (representing the Continent of Europe): 1996

Professional

- Alfred Dunhill Cup (representing Spain): 1999 (winners)
- Ryder Cup (representing Europe): 1999, 2002 (winners), 2004 (winners), 2006 (winners), 2008, 2012 (winners), 2014 (winners), 2016, 2018 (winners), 2021

Ryder Cup points record
1999	2002	2004	2006	2008	2012	2014	2016	2018	2021	Total
3.5	3	4.5	4	1	2	2.5	2	3	3	28.5

- Seve Trophy (representing Continental Europe): 2000 (winners), 2003
- World Cup (representing Spain): 2001, 2004, 2005, 2009

== Golf equipment ==
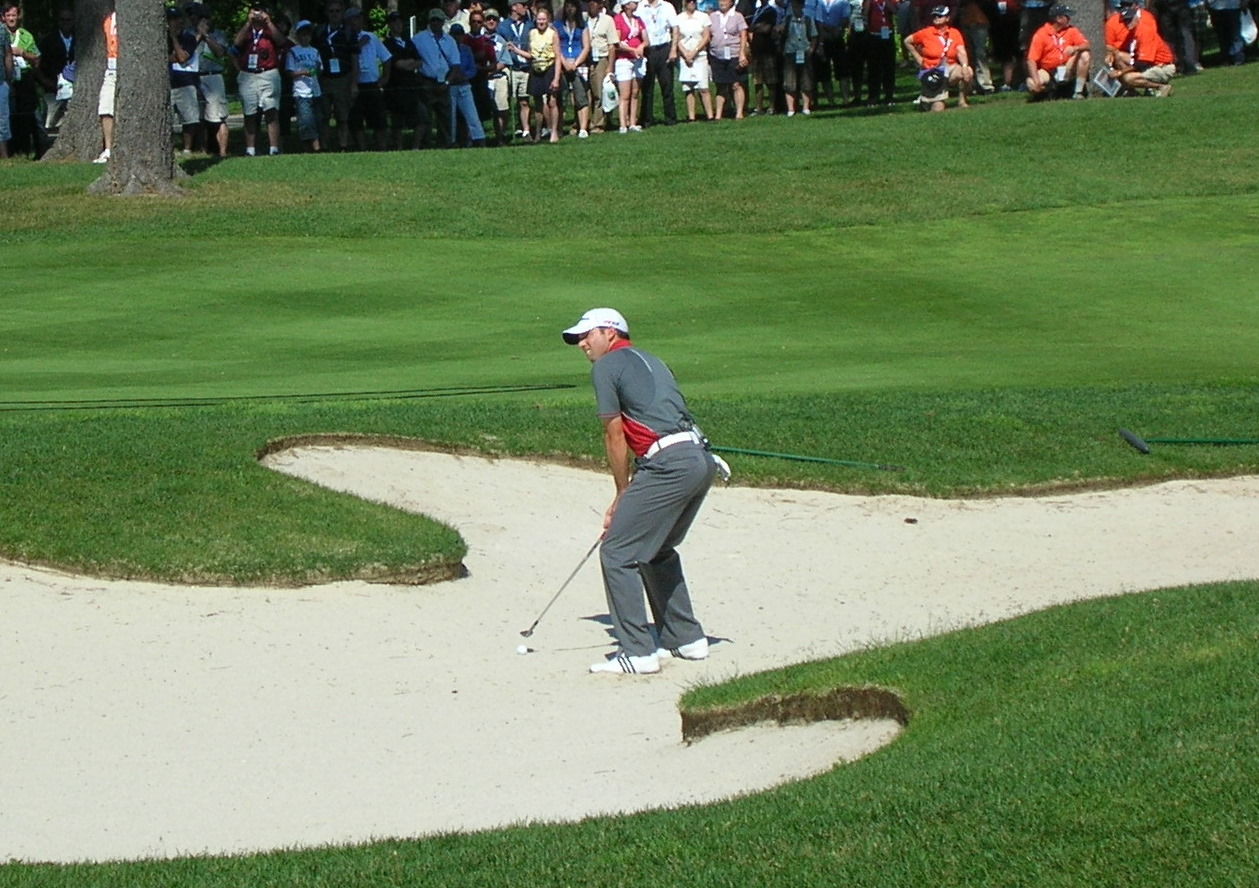
García at the 2009 Telus World Skins Game in Lévis, Canada

García previously had an endorsement deal with TaylorMade and Adidas, at the time a joint company used all TaylorMade equipment, and Adidas shoes and clothing.

Following the acquisition of TaylorMade by KPS Capital Partners and separation from Adidas and after fifteen years with the company, in January 2018 Sergio García severed his ties with TaylorMade, remained with Adidas and signed with Callaway. At the start of 2020, García confirmed he had parted ways with Callaway after two years to become a free agent.

== See also ==
- List of golfers with most European Tour wins
- List of golfers with most Asian Tour wins
- Monday Night Golf
