= Ted Purdy =

American professional golfer (born 1973)

Personal information
- Full name: Theodore Townsend Purdy
- Nationality: United States
- Born: August 15, 1973 (age 53) Phoenix, Arizona, U.S.
- Height: 5 ft 10 in (1.78 m)
- Weight: 175 lb (79 kg; 12.5 st)

Career
- Sport: Golf
- College: University of Arizona
- Turned professional: 1996
- Current tours: PGA Tour (past champion status)
- Former tours: Asian PGA Tour; Web.com Tour; PGA Tour Latinoamérica
- Professional wins: 4
- Highest ranking: 64 (May 22, 2005)

Number of wins by tour
- PGA Tour: 1
- Asian Tour: 1
- Korn Ferry Tour: 1
- Other: 1

Best results in major championships
- Masters Tournament: T32: 2006
- PGA Championship: T10: 2005
- U.S. Open: T26: 2006
- The Open Championship: T73: 2005

Achievements and awards
- Asian PGA Tour Rookie of the Year: 1997

Theodore Townsend Purdy (born August 15, 1973) is an American professional golfer. He has won one PGA Tour tournament, the 2005 EDS Byron Nelson Championship. He has also won on the Nationwide Tour and the Asian Tour.

== Early life ==
Purdy was born in Phoenix, Arizona. He graduated from Brophy College Preparatory in 1992. He went to the University of Arizona as a finance major and was inducted into its Sports Hall of Fame in 2005.

== Professional career ==
In 2007 he finished just outside the top 125 on the PGA Tour money list, and lost full playing rights for the 2008 season. He returned to the PGA Tour for 2009 through qualifying school. He has alternated between the PGA Tour and Nationwide Tour since 2010. After Purdy's PGA Tour career stalled, he became a representative for a custom car company. In 2013, Purdy earned his first professional win in eight years at the Abierto Mexicano de Golf on PGA Tour Latinoamérica, two steps below the PGA Tour. It was his fourth professional win in four different tours. He has since resumed playing on a more frequent basis, though on the Web.com Tour and third-tier Gateway Tour. Purdy reached the final rounds of 2013 and 2014 Web.com Tour Qualifying School, but was not able to maintain his tour privileges and plays occasionally through Monday qualifying and Past Champion status.

In 2013, at the time of his resurging pro golf career, Purdy developed a grip aid that was named one of the top ten items at the 2014 PGA Merchandise Show. Purdy's swing coach is Pam Barnett.

== Personal life ==
Purdy is married with two children.

== Professional wins (4) ==
=== PGA Tour wins (1) ===
No.	Date	Tournament	Winning score	Margin of victory	Runner-up
1	May 15, 2005	EDS Byron Nelson Championship	−15 (65-67-68-65=265)	1 stroke	(United States) Sean O'Hair

PGA Tour playoff record (0–1)

No.	Year	Tournament	Opponent	Result
1	2004	MCI Heritage	(United States) Stewart Cink	Lost to birdie on fifth extra hole

=== Asian PGA Tour wins (1) ===
No.	Date	Tournament	Winning score	Margin of victory	Runner-up
1	Nov 2, 1997	Hero Honda Masters	−11 (72-68-66-71=277)	1 stroke	(India) Gaurav Ghei

=== Nationwide Tour wins (1) ===
No.	Date	Tournament	Winning score	Margin of victory	Runner-up
1	Apr 20, 2003	First Tee Arkansas Classic	−13 (69-67-68-71=275)	Playoff	(United States) Chris Tidland

Nationwide Tour playoff record (1–0)

No.	Year	Tournament	Opponent	Result
1	2003	First Tee Arkansas Classic	(United States) Chris Tidland	Won with birdie on third extra hole

=== PGA Tour Latinoamérica wins (1) ===
No.	Date	Tournament	Winning score	Margin of victory	Runner-up
1	Mar 17, 2013	Abierto Mexicano de Golf	−7 (74-69-68-70=281)	1 stroke	(Colombia) David Vanegas

== Results in major championships ==
Tournament	2004	2005	2006	2007
Masters Tournament		CUT	T32	
U.S. Open		T33	T26	
The Open Championship		T74	CUT	
PGA Championship	CUT	T10	CUT	CUT

Top 10
Did not play

CUT = missed the half-way cut
"T" = tied

== Results in The Players Championship ==
Tournament	2005	2006	2007	2008	2009	2010
The Players Championship	T56	CUT	T16			CUT

Did not play

CUT = missed the halfway cut
"T" indicates a tie for a place

== Results in World Golf Championships ==
Tournament	2005
Match Play	
Championship	66
Invitational	DQ

Did not play

DQ = disqualified

== See also ==
- 1998 PGA Tour Qualifying School graduates
- 2003 Nationwide Tour graduates
- 2008 PGA Tour Qualifying School graduates
