= Paul Devenport =

New Zealand professional golfer

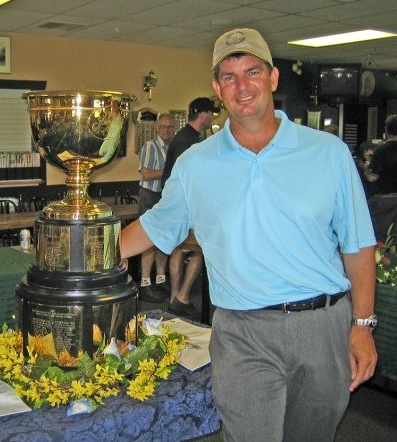

Personal information
- Nationality: New Zealand
- Born: 19 March 1966 (age 60) Wellington, New Zealand
- Height: 6 ft 0 in (1.83 m)
- Weight: 210 lb (95 kg; 15 st)

Career
- Sport: Golf
- College: Houston Baptist University; University of Louisiana at Lafayette
- Turned professional: 1991
- Current tour: Canadian Tour
- Professional wins: 4

Paul Dale Devenport (born 19 March 1966) is a professional golfer from New Zealand.

== Early life and amateur career ==
Devenport was born in Wellington, New Zealand. He grew up in Paraparaumu Beach where his house backed onto the 13th hole of the Paraparaumu Beach Club. After playing amateur golf in Wellington, he was offered a full golf scholarship from Houston Baptist University in Houston, Texas. He later transferred to the University of Louisiana at Lafayette to finish his Business Degree.

== Professional career ==
In 1991, Devenport turned pro. He joined the PGA Tour of Australasia in 1993 but has had most success on the Canadian Tour where he has won four times, including twice in 2001. His final win was the 2001 Shell Payless Open, where he was victorious a few weeks after the death of his mother.

Devenport is also known for performing magic and sleight-of-hand tricks to entertain crowds at golf tournaments. His last full season on tour was 2004.

== Amateur wins ==
- 1984 New Zealand Under-23 Championship

== Professional wins (4) ==
=== Canadian Tour wins (4) ===
No.	Date	Tournament	Winning score	Margin of victory	Runner(s)-up
1	9 Aug 1998	American Express-Shell Cup	6 and 5		(Canada) Wes Martin
2	18 Jun 2000	Telus Edmonton Open	−14 (70-67-65-68=270)	5 strokes	(Canada) Bruce Heuchan, (Canada) Wes Martin
3	17 Jun 2001	Shell Payless Open	−13 (66-67-71-67=271)	1 stroke	(Canada) Blair Piercy
4	12 Aug 2001	Telus Open	−19 (66-71-65-67=269)	Playoff	(United States) Ken Duke

== Team appearances ==
- World Cup (representing New Zealand): 1996
