= Monday Night Golf =

American TV series (1999–2005)

- Also known as: Showdown at Sherwood; Battle at Bighorn; Battle at the Bridges; Duel at Lake Jinsha
- Genre: Sport
- Created by: IMG, ABC Sports, ESPN
- Presented by: Curtis Strange; Fred Couples; Nick Faldo; Paul Azinger
- Starring: Tiger Woods; David Duval; Sergio García; Annika Sörenstam; Karrie Webb; Jack Nicklaus; Lee Trevino; Ernie Els; Phil Mickelson; Hank Kuehne; John Daly; Retief Goosen; Rory McIlroy
- Country of origin: United States
- No. of episodes: 8

Production
- Production locations: California, United States (1999–2005); Zhengzhou, China (2012)
- Camera setup: Multi-camera
- Running time: 4 hours+
- Production companies: ABC Sports (1999–2005); ESPN (2012)

Original release
- Network: ABC
- Release: August 2, 1999 – July 25, 2005
- Release: October 29, 2012

Monday Night Golf is a series of match play golf challenge matches that ran from 1999 to 2005 and was revived in 2012. All the matches have involved World Number 1 Tiger Woods, and the first seven were run by his representatives IMG and were broadcast on ABC. The eighth was organized by Excel Sports Management, Woods' representatives since he left IMG in 2010. It marked the first time that live golf had been shown in prime time during the week in the United States.

The first match was played at Sherwood Country Club, and dubbed the Showdown at Sherwood. The next three were held at Bighorn Golf Club and known as the Battle at Bighorn, and the next three were known as the Battle at the Bridges and played at The Bridges at Rancho Santa Fe.

Monday Night Golf proved to be an initial success, drawing more viewers than the final round of the U.S. Open, and being second only to the final round of the Masters Tournament in terms of golf broadcasts. Ratings increased significantly for the second match, but they declined rapidly after that, and the event was initially cancelled after the 2005 edition, with Woods also wishing to take a break from the event. However, on August 15, 2012, it was announced by Excel Sports Management that the first new match in seven years had been scheduled. It took place on October 29, 2012, at Lake Jinsha International Golf Club in China, and featured World No. 2 Woods facing World No. 1 and PGA Champion Rory McIlroy.

== 1999 Showdown at Sherwood ==
The first challenge match was played on August 2, 1999, between Tiger Woods and David Duval, then world number 2 and also a client of IMG. In order for the match to be played in daylight and still be shown live during prime time Eastern Standard Time, it was held in the West, at Sherwood Country Club in Thousand Oaks, California. Sherwood paid $1,000,000 to host the event, which was dubbed the Showdown at Sherwood.

The match was eagerly anticipated as a head-to-head between the two leading players at the time, and contested over 18 holes in a matchplay format. Woods won the match 2&1 to collect a check for $1,100,000, with Duval picking up $400,000. Both players donated $200,000 to charity, split between the First Tee initiative and charities of their choice. The match proved to be a ratings success, drawing a 6.9 national Nielsen rating, higher than what had been predicted by broadcasters ABC Sports.

=== Scorecards ===
Hole	Par	Yardage	Woods score	Duval score	Match score
1	4	385	4	3	Duval 1up
2	5	522	6	5	Duval 2up
3	3	188	3	4	Duval 1up
4	5	541	4	5	AS
5	4	457	4	4	AS
6	3	186	2	X	Woods 1up
7	5	537	4	4	Woods 1up
8	3	166	2	3	Woods 2up
9	4	446	4	4	Woods 2up
10	4	341	4	4	Woods 2up
11	5	531	5	5	Woods 2up
12	3	202	2	3	Woods 3up
13	4	459	5	4	Woods 2up
14	5	534	5	4	Woods 1up
15	4	425	4	4	Woods 1up
16	4	449	3	5	Woods 2up
17	3	232	3	3	Woods wins 2 & 1
18	4	424	–	–	

== 2000 Battle at Bighorn ==
The second challenge match was played over the Canyons course at Bighorn Golf Club in Palm Desert, California on August 28, 2000, between Tiger Woods and Sergio García, who had made the headlines when finishing as runner-up to Woods at the 1999 PGA Championship. As with the previous year, the match was contested over 18 holes in matchplay format, with the winner collecting $1,100,000 and the runner-up $400,000.

The Battle at Bighorn, as it was titled, was won by García 1up, and as in 1999, both players donated a portion of their winnings to charity. The match was an even bigger ratings success than the inaugural event, drawing a 7.6 Nielsen rating, which proved to be the highest in the series.

=== Scorecards ===
Hole	Par	Yardage	Woods score	García score	Match score
1	4	429	4	5	Woods 1up
2	4	435	4	4	Woods 1up
3	5	531	5	4	AS
4	4	447	4	4	AS
5	4	367	4	5	Woods 1up
6	3	183	3	3	Woods 1up
7	5	519	4	4	Woods 1up
8	3	220	3	2	AS
9	4	449	4	4	AS
10	4	397	3	3	AS
11	4	434	4	4	AS
12	5	550	5	5	AS
13	3	227	3	3	AS
14	4	351	3	3	AS
15	5	538	4	4	AS
16	3	194	3	2	García 1up
17	4	457	4	4	García 1up
18	4	355	X	3	García wins 1up

== 2001 Battle at Bighorn ==
The second Battle at Bighorn saw a change of format, with two mixed teams competing over 18 holes in foursomes (alternate shot) matchplay. Tiger Woods and David Duval, who had contested the Showdown at Sherwood two years previously, were joined by the worlds two leading female golfers, as organisers sought to raise the profile of the women's game. Woods was paired with Annika Sörenstam, and Duval with Karrie Webb.

The match finished under lights and was won by Woods and Sörenstam with a par at the first extra hole. They had come from 2 behind with three holes to play, Sörenstam taking the match into sudden death by holing a 10-foot birdie putt on the 18th.

Woods and Sörenstam shared the $1,200,000 winners check, with Duval and Webb sharing $500,000. Viewing figures for this third show were down markedly from the previous year, returning a 6.1 Nielsen rating.

=== Scorecards ===
Hole	Par	Yardage	Woods/Sörenstam score	Duval/Webb score	Match score
1	4	429	5	5	AS
2	4	416	4	5	Woods/Sörenstam 1up
3	5	531	5	4	AS
4	4	447	4	4	AS
5	4	367	3	5	Woods/Sörenstam 1up
6	3	175	3	3	Woods/Sörenstam 1up
7	5	519	4	5	Woods/Sörenstam 2up
8	3	202	3	3	Woods/Sörenstam 2up
9	4	449	5	4	Woods/Sörenstam 1up
10	4	397	6	4	AS
11	4	434	6	4	Duval/Webb 1up
12	5	550	5	6	AS
13	3	227	3	3	AS
14	4	351	5	4	Duval/Webb 1up
15	5	528	5	4	Duval/Webb 2up
16	3	163	3	4	Duval/Webb 1up
17	4	443	5	5	Duval/Webb 1up
18	4	355	3	4	AS
19 (18)	4	355	4	X	Woods/Sörenstam win in 19 holes

== 2002 Battle at Bighorn ==
The third Battle at Bighorn took place on July 29, 2002, and saw another change of format as Tiger Woods and Sergio García, who had fought out the first Bighorn match, were joined by two of golfs all-time greats in a fourball betterball matchplay contest. Woods was paired with 18 time major winner Jack Nicklaus, and García with 6 time major winner Lee Trevino, who triumphed over Nicklaus in a play-off for the 1971 U.S. Open.

The match was won by Woods and Nicklaus 3 & 2, with Woods making the major contribution, recording nine birdies in the 16 holes that were played. Despite the apparent attraction of some of the biggest names in golf, viewing figures had fallen even further from the previous years low, with this fourth instalment generating a 5.1 Nielsen rating.

=== Scorecards ===
Hole	Par	Yardage	Woods/Nicklaus score	García/Trevino score	Match score
1	4	429	3	4	Woods/Nicklaus 1up
2	4	416	3	4	Woods/Nicklaus 2up
3	5	531	4	4	Woods/Nicklaus 2up
4	4	447	4	3	Woods/Nicklaus 1up
5	4	367	4	3	All square
6	3	175	3	2	García/Trevino 1up
7	5	519	4	5	All square
8	3	202	2	3	Woods/Nicklaus 1up
9	4	449	3	4	Woods/Nicklaus 2up
10	4	397	3	5	Woods/Nicklaus 3up
11	4	434	4	3	Woods/Nicklaus 2up
12	5	550	4	4	Woods/Nicklaus 2up
13	3	227	2	3	Woods/Nicklaus 3up
14	4	351	3	3	Woods/Nicklaus 3up
15	5	528	4	4	Woods/Nicklaus 3up
16	3	163	3	3	Woods/Nicklaus win 3 & 2
17	4	443	–	–	
18	4	355	–	–	

== 2003 Battle at the Bridges ==
The fifth match in the series took place on July 28, 2003, and used the same fourball format as the previous year, but with four top PGA Tour players. Woods and García were again in opposition, this time paired with Ernie Els and Phil Mickelson respectively. The match also had a new venue, The Bridges Club in Rancho Santa Fe, California, and was titled Battle at the Bridges as a result.

The match finished under lights, with García and Mickelson coming out on top, defeating their then world number one and two ranked opponents 3 & 1. García eagled the 16th hole to put himself and Mickelson on the road to the $1,200,000 winners prize. Woods and Els shared $500,000, with $300,000 being donated to charity.

For the third year running, viewing figures fell, with the first instalment of a three-year deal at the Bridges recording a 4.6 Nielsen rating.

== 2004 Battle at the Bridges ==
The second Battle at the Bridges was played on August 2, 2004, in the now established fourball betterball format. The theme was long drivers. Tiger Woods was joined by Hank Kuehne to take on the pairing of Phil Mickelson and John Daly.

Daly and Mickelson started well and were 2 up through 12 holes, but Woods and Kuehne made three straight birdies followed by an eagle to win the next four holes and take a 2 up lead themselves. They halved the 17th hole to win the match 2 & 1.

Ratings for the Battle at the Bridges continued to slide, with the 2004 edition producing a 3.6 Nielsen rating, the lowest of the series to date.

== 2005 Battle at the Bridges ==
The final Battle at the Bridges took place on July 25, 2005. Organisers had wanted this last exhibition to be contested by the big four names in world golf at the time, Tiger Woods, Phil Mickelson, Vijay Singh and Ernie Els but Singh refused to take part, so Tiger Woods was teamed up with John Daly, to take on Mickelson and Els. However Els later withdrew and was replaced by Retief Goosen.

In the most one sided match of the series, Mickelson and Goosen won 5 & 3, to collect $500,000 each plus $100,000 for each of their nominated charities. Woods and Daly picked up $200,000 each, with $50,000 for their charities. It was also the first match not to reach the floodlit last three holes, as Goosen made four birdies in six holes to seal the win at the 15th.

With ratings failing to pick up, and Woods stating his desire to take a break from the event, this proved to be the final match in the series.

== 2012 Duel at Lake Jinsha ==
On August 15, 2012, it was announced that an eighth match (and the first in seven years) would take place on October 29, 2012, at Lake Jinsha International Golf Club in China. It will feature Woods facing Rory McIlroy, who was coming off a four win PGA Tour season, and at the time of the announcement had just won the PGA Championship. Woods, meanwhile, had won three times during the season. He was also ranked first in the FedEx Cup Standings at the time, while McIlroy was ranked first in the World Golf Rankings. This was the first match to take place in the FedEx Cup era.

By the time of the match, Woods was the World No. 2, while McIlroy was World No. 1.

While ESPN/ABC televised the first seven matches, Australian syndicator Spondo distributed a pay-per-view internet feed. At the outset, many of the United States servers were swamped and many viewers had to wait until midway through the front nine to view the stream, at which time the bandwidth was increased, and most viewers could watch.

The match was played in a stroke play format, and was closely contested. McIlroy built a three shot lead after three holes, but with a birdie at seven and a chip-in at twelve, Woods closed the gap to one. Woods missed birdie putts to tie McIlroy at both sixteen and seventeen, and needed to hole a greenside bunker shot at the final hole to salvage extra holes. He lipped out and instead settled for par and a four-under 68. McIlroy brushed in a three-footer for par and a 67 (-5), to win by a shot.

Hole	Par	Woods	McIlroy
1	4	4	3
2	5	5	5
3	5	5	3
4	4	4	4
5	4	4	4
6	3	3	3
7	4	3	4
8	5	4	4
9	4	4	4
OUT	36	35	33
10	5	4	4
11	4	4	4
12	3	2	3
13	4	5	4
14	4	3	4
15	5	4	4
16	4	4	4
17	3	3	3
18	4	4	4
IN	36	33	34
TOTAL	72	68 (-4)	67 (-5)

== Ratings ==
1 point is 1 percent of American TVs that were tuned into Monday Night Golf.

Year	Competitors	Ratings
1999	Tiger Woods vs. David Duval	6.9
2000	Tiger Woods vs. Sergio García	7.6
2001	Woods/Sörenstam vs. Duval/Webb	6.1
2002	Woods/Nicklaus vs. García/Trevino	5.1
2003	Woods/Els vs. García/Mickelson	4.6
2004	Woods/Kuehne vs. Mickelson/Daly	3.6
2005	Woods/Daly vs. Goosen/Mickelson	3.0

== Records ==
Golfer	Win	Loss	Percentage
Rory McIlroy	1	0	1.000
Retief Goosen	1	0	1.000
Hank Kuehne	1	0	1.000
Jack Nicklaus	1	0	1.000
Annika Sörenstam	1	0	1.000
Sergio García	2	1	.667
Phil Mickelson	2	1	.667
Tiger Woods	4	4	.500
Ernie Els	0	1	.000
Lee Trevino	0	1	.000
Karrie Webb	0	1	.000
David Duval	0	2	.000
John Daly	0	2	.000
