= Steve Runge =

American golfer and coach

Personal information
- Nationality: United States
- Born: June 12, 1968 (age 58) Newport Beach, California, U.S.
- Height: 6 ft 2 in (1.88 m)
- Weight: 175 lb (79 kg; 12.5 st)

Career
- Sport: Golf
- College: Ohio State University
- Turned professional: 1992
- Former tour: Nationwide Tour
- Professional wins: 3

Number of wins by tour
- Korn Ferry Tour: 1
- Other: 2

Steve Runge (born June 12, 1968) is an American college golf coach and former professional golfer.

== Early life and amateur career ==
In 1968, Runge was born in Newport Beach, California. He played college golf at Ohio State University.

== Professional career ==
In 1992, Runge turned professional. He played on the PGA Tour's developmental tour from 1995 to 1996 and from 2000 to 2006. He won once at the 2000 Buy.com Richmond Open. He also played various mini-tours during his career.

After his playing career was over, Runge worked as a golf instructor at IMG Academy in Bradenton, Florida. In August 2011, he was hired as the men's golf coach at Clayton State University in Morrow, Georgia. In August 2014, he became the head coach at the University of Central Arkansas.

== Professional wins (3) ==
=== Buy.com Tour wins (1) ===
No.	Date	Tournament	Winning score	Margin of victory	Runner-up
1	May 14, 2000	Buy.com Richmond Open	−8 (67-67-72-66=272)	Playoff	(United States) Chris Smith

Buy.com Tour playoff record (1–0)

No.	Year	Tournament	Opponent	Result
1	2000	Buy.com Richmond Open	(United States) Chris Smith	Won with birdie on first extra hole

=== Canadian Tour wins (1) ===
No.	Date	Tournament	Winning score	Margin of victory	Runner-up
1	Jan 21, 2001 (2000 season)	Panasonic Panama Open	−16 (69-70-66-67=272)	2 strokes	(United States) Jonathan Byrd

=== Other wins (1) ===
- 1997 Utah Open
