= Jace Bugg =

American professional golfer (1976–2003)

Personal information
- Nationality: United States
- Born: November 6, 1976 Henderson, Kentucky, U.S.
- Died: December 4, 2003 (aged 27) Evansville, Indiana, U.S.
- Height: 5 ft 10 in (1.78 m)
- Weight: 200 lb (91 kg; 14 st)

Career
- Sport: Golf
- College: Rend Lake College
- Turned professional: 1997
- Former tours: Nationwide Tour; Canadian Tour
- Professional wins: 2

Number of wins by tour
- Korn Ferry Tour: 1
- Other: 1

Jace Bugg (November 6, 1976 – December 4, 2003) was an American professional golfer who played on the Nationwide Tour.

== Professional career ==
He played on the Canadian Tour from 1999 to 2001 where he picked up a win in 2001 at the South Carolina Challenge. He joined the Nationwide Tour in 2002 when he was a Monday qualifier for the Arkansas Classic and went on to win the event.

== Personal life ==
Bugg was diagnosed with leukemia in November 2002 and died on December 4, 2003, at St. Mary's Hospital and Medical Center in Evansville, Indiana. The Kentucky Golf Association started The Jace Bugg Award in 2005 for Sportsmanship, an award they give out annually.

== Awards and honors ==
- In 1997, Bugg was named the Kentucky Golf Association Player of the Year
- In 2005, he was posthumously named to the Rend Lake College Hall of Fame.

== Professional wins (2) ==
=== Buy.com Tour wins (1) ===
No.	Date	Tournament	Winning score	Margin of victory	Runner-up
1	Apr 21, 2002	Arkansas Classic	−17 (66-68-72-65=271)	1 stroke	(United States) Jason Caron

=== Canadian Tour wins (1) ===
No.	Date	Tournament	Winning score	Margin of victory	Runner-up
1	Mar 11, 2001	South Carolina Challenge	−14 (72-68-71-63=274)	3 strokes	(Canada) Rob McMillan
