= Jason Bohn =

American professional golfer

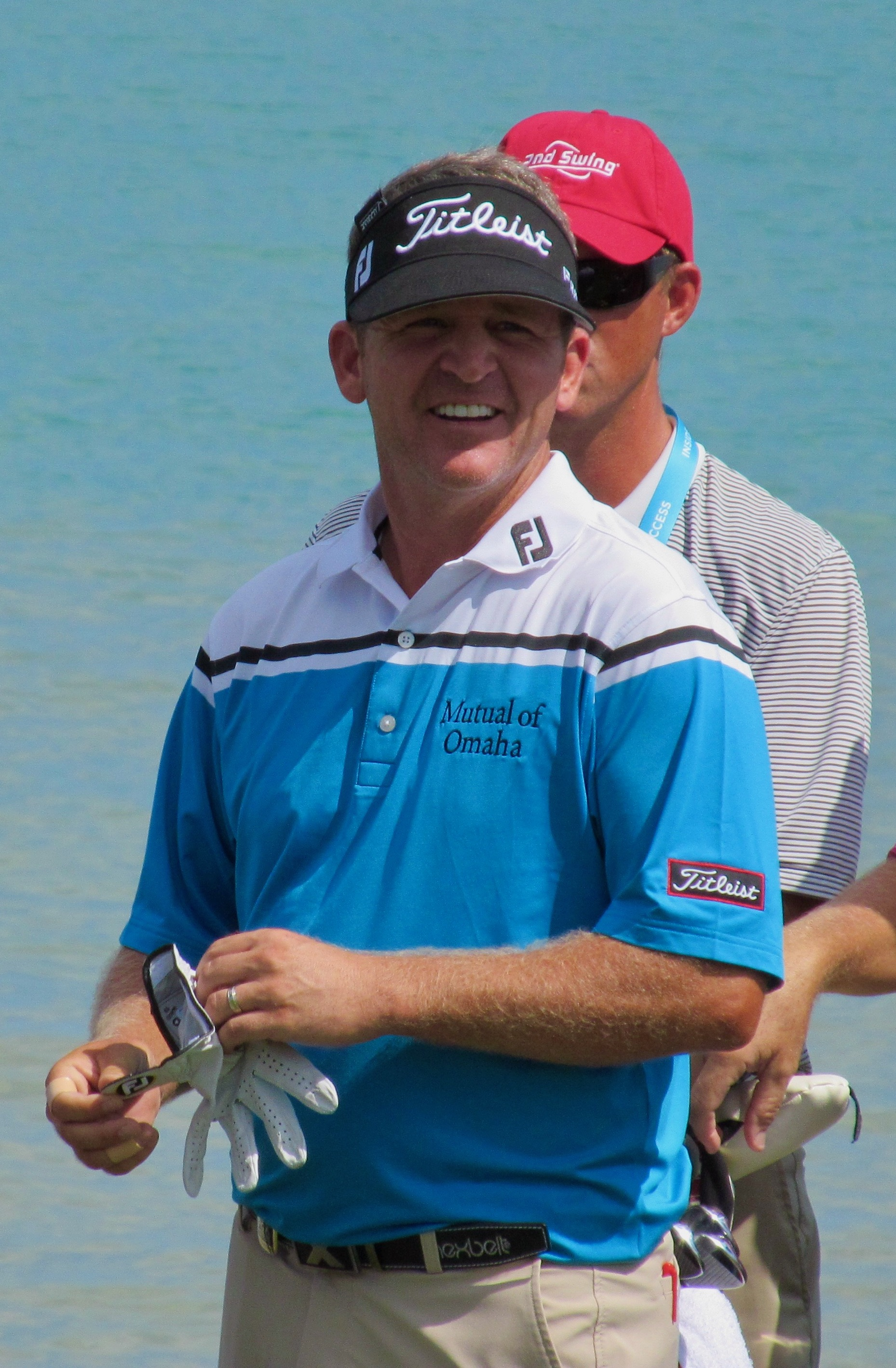
- Bohn at the 2015 PGA Championship

Personal information
- Full name: Jason Duehn Bohn
- Nationality: United States
- Born: April 24, 1973 (age 53) Lewisburg, Pennsylvania, U.S.
- Height: 6 ft 0 in (1.83 m)
- Weight: 180 lb (82 kg; 13 st)
- Spouse: Tewana
- Children: 2

Career
- Sport: Golf
- College: University of Alabama
- Turned professional: 1992
- Current tour: PGA Tour Champions
- Former tours: PGA Tour; Nationwide Tour; Canadian Tour; NGA Hooters Tour
- Professional wins: 7
- Highest ranking: 58 (November 15, 2015)

Number of wins by tour
- PGA Tour: 2
- Korn Ferry Tour: 1
- Other: 4

Best results in major championships
- Masters Tournament: T39: 2006
- PGA Championship: T34: 2005
- U.S. Open: 71st: 2012
- The Open Championship: CUT: 2010

Jason Duehn Bohn (born April 24, 1973) is an American professional golfer who played on the PGA Tour. He won two PGA Tour events.

== Amateur career ==
Bohn was born in Lewisburg, Pennsylvania. In 1992, while a sophomore on the Alabama golf team, Bohn was playing in a charity fund-raiser in Tuscaloosa when he made a hole-in-one worth $1 million. Bohn dropped his amateur status and golf scholarship on the spot and turned professional. He graduated from Alabama in 1995.

== Professional career ==
While playing the Canadian Tour, Bohn shot a 58 in the final round to win the 2001 Bayer Championship. He also played the Nationwide Tour before earning promotion to the PGA Tour, where he has played since 2004. In 2005 he won the PGA Tour's B.C. Open.

During the 2009 season Bohn lost in a playoff at the Wyndham Championship along with Kevin Stadler to Ryan Moore.

In April 2010, Bohn won the 2010 Zurich Classic of New Orleans wire to wire, when he birdied three of the last four holes to win by two shots.

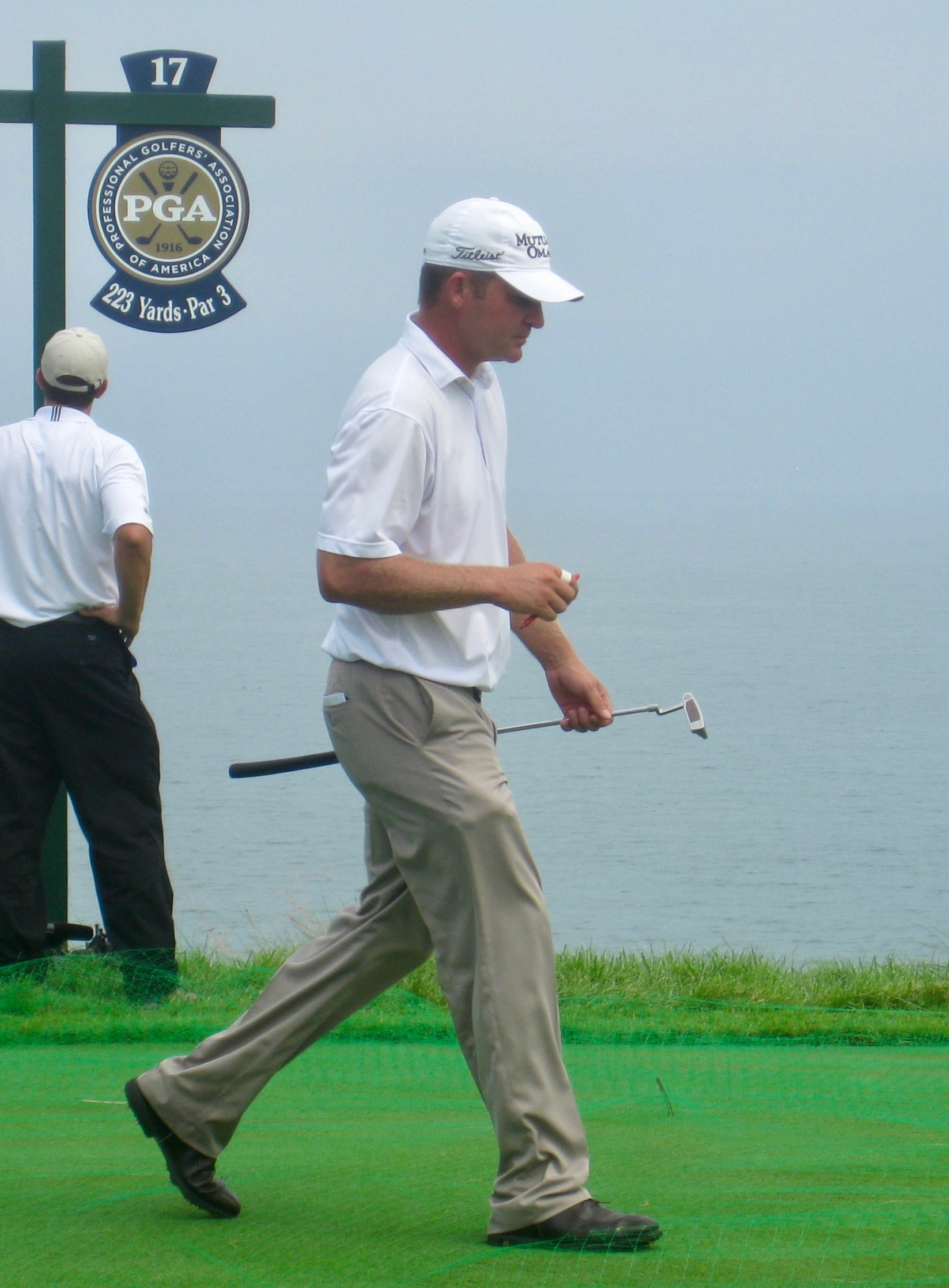
Bohn at the 2010 PGA Championship

At the Greenbrier Classic in July 2015, Bohn shot a nine under par 61 during the third round that moved him from the cutline into the co-lead entering the final round. The round of 61 was Bohn's lowest ever career round on the PGA Tour. He also had his best FedEx Cup finish of 40th.

== Professional wins (7) ==
=== PGA Tour wins (2) ===
No.	Date	Tournament	Winning score	Margin of victory	Runner(s)-up
1	Jul 17, 2005	B.C. Open	−24 (64-68-66-66=264)	1 stroke	(United States) J. P. Hayes, (Australia) Brendan Jones, (United States) Ryan Palmer, (United States) John Rollins
2	Apr 25, 2010	Zurich Classic of New Orleans	−18 (65-67-71-67=270)	2 strokes	(United States) Jeff Overton

PGA Tour playoff record (0–2)

No.	Year	Tournament	Opponents	Result
1	2009	Wyndham Championship	(United States) Ryan Moore, (United States) Kevin Stadler	Moore won with birdie on third extra hole Bohn eliminated by par on first hole
2	2015	OHL Classic at Mayakoba	(Scotland) Russell Knox, (Northern Ireland) Graeme McDowell	McDowell won with birdie on first extra hole

=== Nationwide Tour wins (1) ===
No.	Date	Tournament	Winning score	Margin of victory	Runner-up
1	Aug 3, 2003	Chattanooga Classic	−23 (65-67-69-64=265)	1 stroke	(United States) Kyle Thompson

Nationwide Tour playoff record (0–2)

No.	Year	Tournament	Opponent	Result
1	2003	Samsung Canadian PGA Championship	(United States) Tom Carter	Lost to par on first extra hole
2	2003	Oregon Classic	(United States) Chris Couch	Lost to birdie on first extra hole

=== Canadian Tour wins (2) ===
No.	Date	Tournament	Winning score	Margin of victory	Runner-up
1	Jun 4, 2000	Shell Payless Open	−14 (66-69-67-64=266)	1 stroke	(United States) Derek Gilchrist
2	Sep 16, 2001	Bayer Championship	−24 (68-71-63-58=260)	2 strokes	(United States) Jace Bugg

=== NGA Hooters Tour wins (1) ===
No.	Date	Tournament	Winning score	Margin of victory	Runner-up
1	Mar 9, 2003	Hooters Sunshine Classic	−8 (65-71=136) (Note: Shortened to 36 holes due to weather.)	Playoff	(United States) Vaughn Taylor

=== Other wins (1) ===
No.	Date	Tournament	Winning score	Margin of victory	Runner-up
1	Nov 19, 2006	Callaway Golf Pebble Beach Invitational	−14 (69-69-65-71=274)	1 stroke	(United States) Scott Simpson

== Results in major championships ==
Tournament	2005	2006	2007	2008	2009	2010	2011	2012	2013	2014	2015	2016
Masters Tournament		T39					CUT					
U.S. Open				CUT				71				
The Open Championship						CUT						
PGA Championship	T34	CUT				CUT				T40	T37	CUT

Did not play

CUT = missed the half-way cut
"T" = tied

== Results in The Players Championship ==
Tournament	2006	2007	2008	2009	2010	2011	2012	2013	2014	2015	2016	2017
The Players Championship	T27	CUT	71	T49	T64	T61		T55	CUT	CUT	CUT	CUT

Did not play

CUT = missed the halfway cut
"T" indicates a tie for a place

== Results in World Golf Championships ==
Tournament	2005	2006	2007	2008	2009	2010
Match Play						
Championship	T32					
Invitational						T65
Champions						T53

Did not play

"T" = Tied
Note that the HSBC Champions did not become a WGC event until 2009.

== See also ==
- 2003 Nationwide Tour graduates
- 2004 PGA Tour Qualifying School graduates
