= Telus Open =

Tournament information
- Location: Quebec, Canada
- Established: 2000
- Courses: Le Versant GC (2000, 2002); Quatre Domaines GC (2001)
- Tours: Canadian Tour; Quebec PGA Tour
- Format: Stroke play
- Prize fund: C$200,000
- Final year: 2002

Tournament record score
- Aggregate: 269 Paul Devenport (2001); 269 Ken Duke (2001)
- To par: −19 Paul Devenport (2001) −19 Ken Duke (2001)

Final champion
- (United States) Hank Kuehne

The Telus Open was a golf tournament that was held in the Greater Montreal area in Quebec, Canada. First held in 2000 as the QuebecTel Open, it had one of the largest purses on the Canadian Tour and the biggest on the Quebec PGA Tour. It was held for the final time in 2002.

All three editions of the Telus sponsored tournament resulted in a tie at the end of the 72-holes of regulation play, necessitating sudden-death playoffs to determine the winners.

== Winners ==
Year	Venue	Winner	Score	Ref
Telus Open
2002	Le Versant	(United States) Hank Kuehne	273 (−15) (Note: Kuehne won with a birdie on the second hole of a sudden-death playoff.)	
2001	Quatre Domaines	(New Zealand) Paul Devenport	269 (−19) (Note: Devenport won with a birdie on the second hole of a sudden-death playoff.)	
QuebecTel Open
2000	Le Versant	(Canada) Philip Jonas	274 (−14) (Note: Jonas won on the first hole of a sudden-death playoff.)	
