= List of Colorado-related lists =

Coordinates: 38.9972°N 105.5478°W

The location of the State of Colorado in the United States.

The following two master lists include links to lists related to the U.S. State of Colorado.

1. Colorado-related lists by topic
2. Alphabetical list of Colorado-related lists

== Colorado-related lists by topic ==
=== General lists ===
- Bibliography of Colorado
- Index of Colorado-related articles
- Outline of Colorado

=== Biology lists ===
The Rocky Mountain bighorn sheep is the Colorado state mammal.

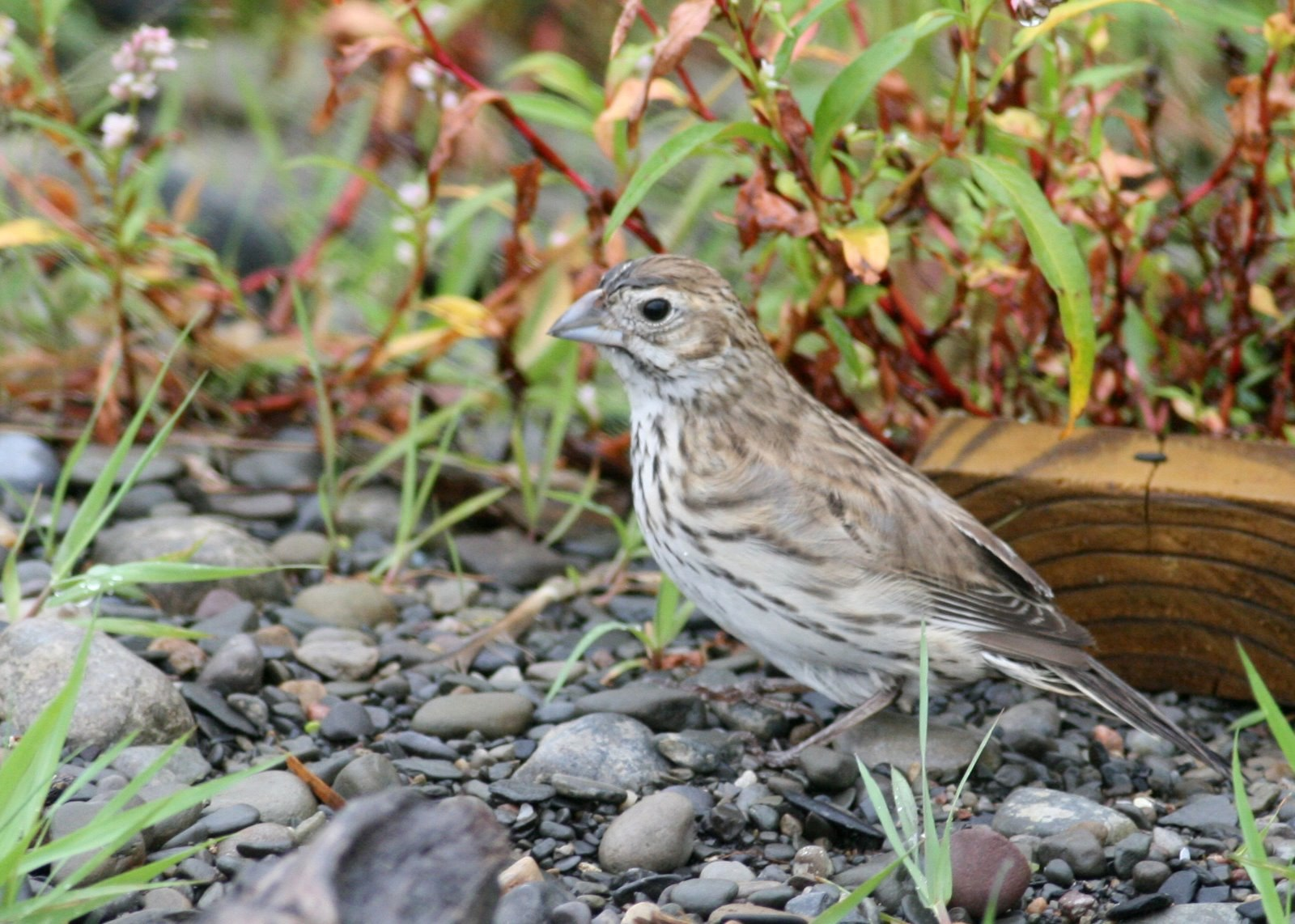
The lark bunting is the Colorado state bird.

- List of amphibians of Colorado
- List of birds of Colorado
  - List of birds of Black Canyon of the Gunnison National Park
  - List of birds of Rocky Mountain National Park
- List of fishes of Colorado
  - List of fishes of Boulder Creek, Colorado
- Lists of flora in Colorado
- List of mammals of Colorado
- List of reptiles of Colorado
- List of the prehistoric life of Colorado
  - List of the Paleozoic life of Colorado
  - List of the Mesozoic life of Colorado
  - List of the Cenozoic life of Colorado

=== Business lists ===
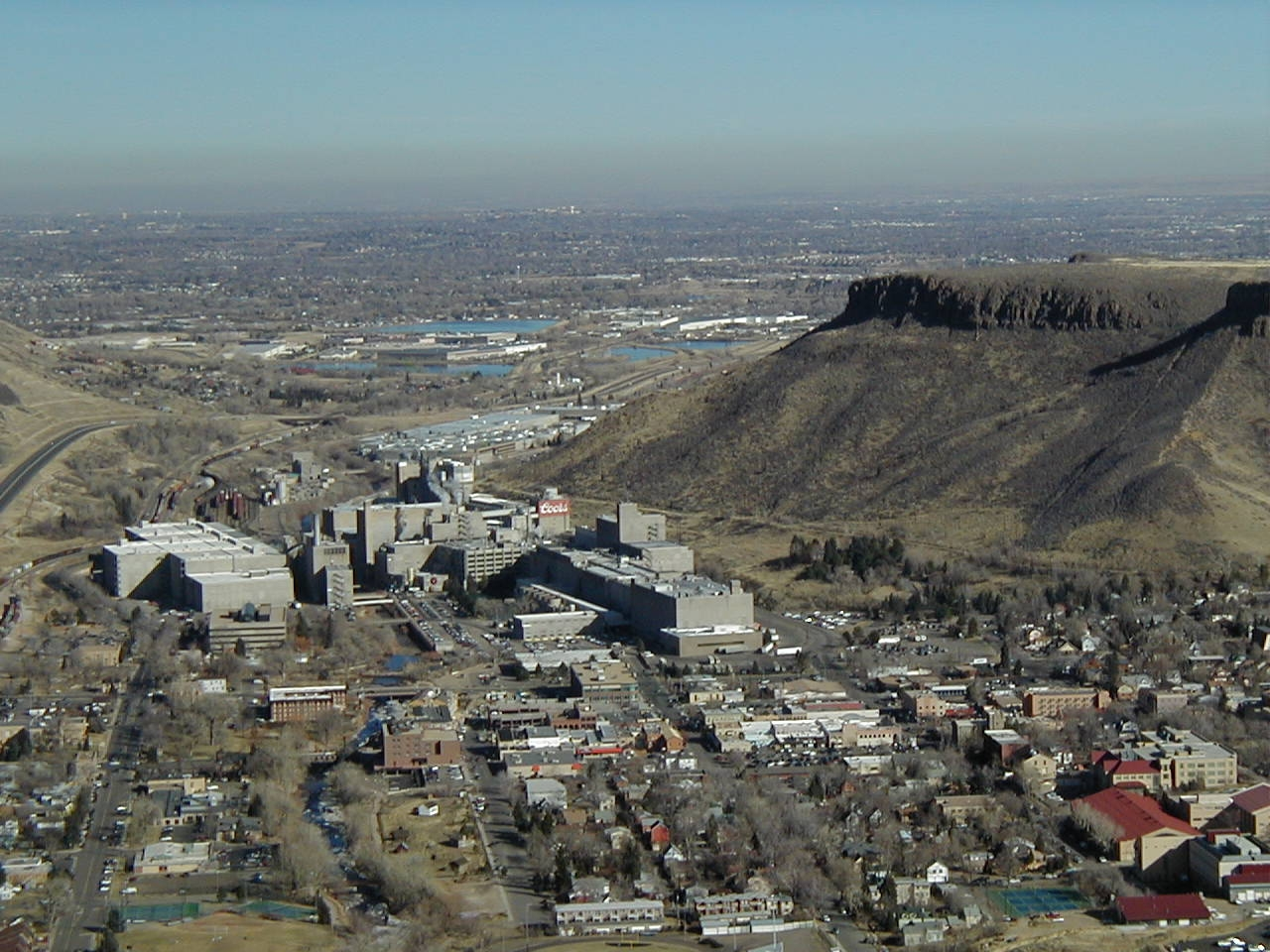
The Coors Brewery in Golden, Colorado.

- List of African-American newspapers in Colorado
- List of botanical gardens and arboretums in Colorado
- List of breweries in Colorado
- List of casinos in Colorado
- List of Colorado companies
- List of companies with Denver area operations
- List of hospitals in Colorado
- List of museums in Colorado
- List of nature centers in Colorado
- List of newspapers in Colorado
- List of power stations in Colorado
- List of radio stations in Colorado
- List of Colorado ski resorts
- List of television stations in Colorado
- List of theaters in Colorado

=== Culture lists ===
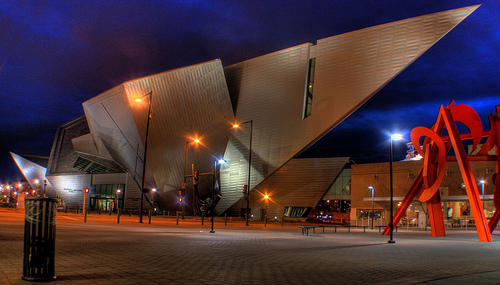
The Denver Art Museum at night.

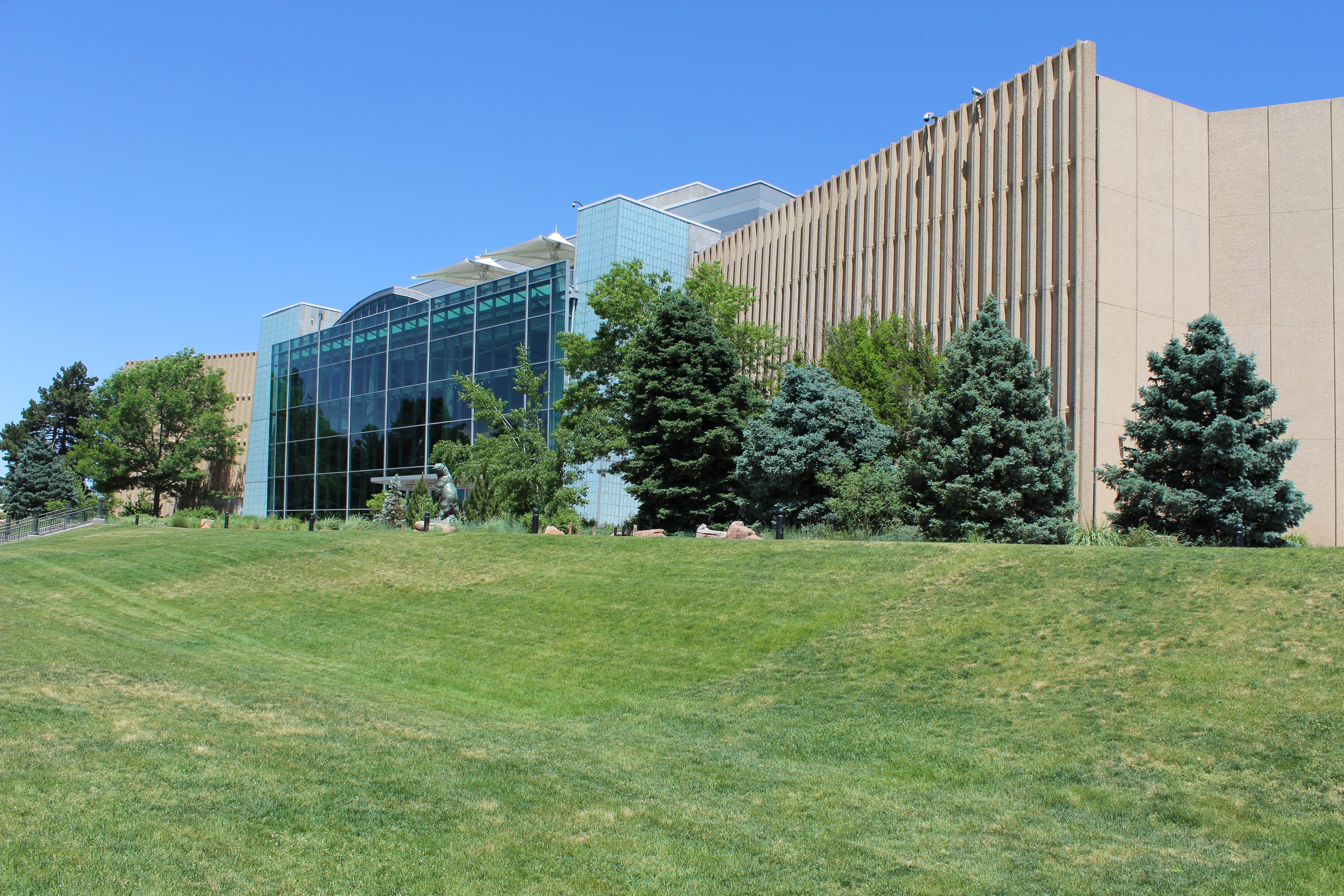
The Denver Museum of Nature and Science.

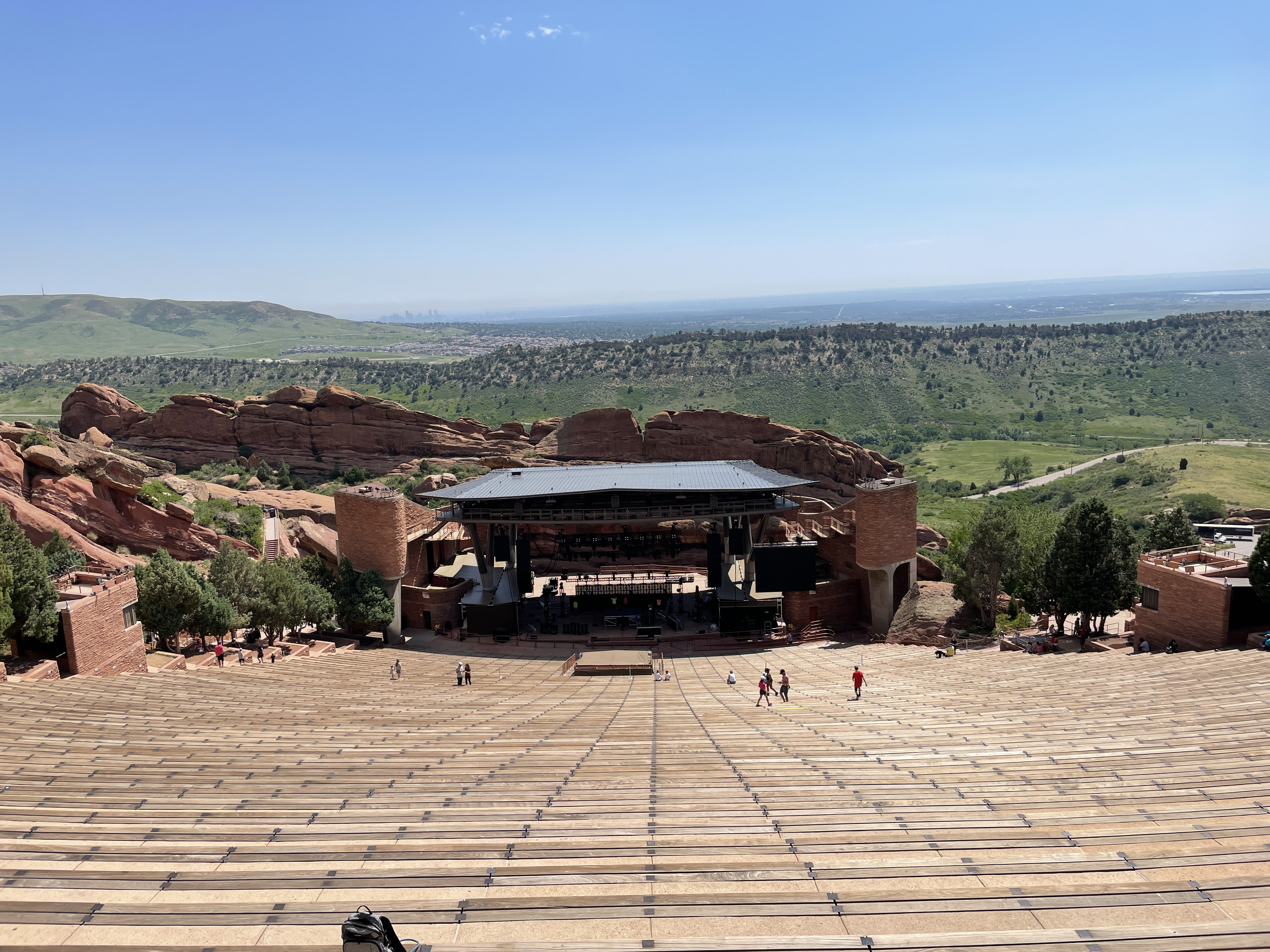
Red Rocks Amphitheatre.

- List of Ancestral Puebloan dwellings in Colorado
- List of Art Deco architecture in Colorado
- List of baseball parks in Denver
- List of botanical gardens and arboretums in Colorado
- List of Carnegie libraries in Colorado
- List of city nicknames in Colorado
- List of Colorado fish hatcheries
- List of Colorado locations by per capita income
- List of Colorado state prisons
- List of Colorado state symbols
- List of county courthouses in Colorado
- List of Denver landmarks
- List of Manitou Springs Historic District buildings
- List of museums in Colorado
- List of music venues around Denver
- List of nature centers in Colorado
- List of neighborhoods in Denver
- List of post offices in Colorado
- List of public art in Denver
- List of ships named the USS Colorado
- List of shootings in Colorado
- List of sister cities in Colorado
- List of tallest buildings in Colorado Springs
- List of tallest buildings in Denver
- List of the oldest buildings in Colorado
- List of theaters in Colorado
- List of United States federal courthouses in Colorado
- List of U.S. postage stamps featuring Colorado

=== Education lists ===
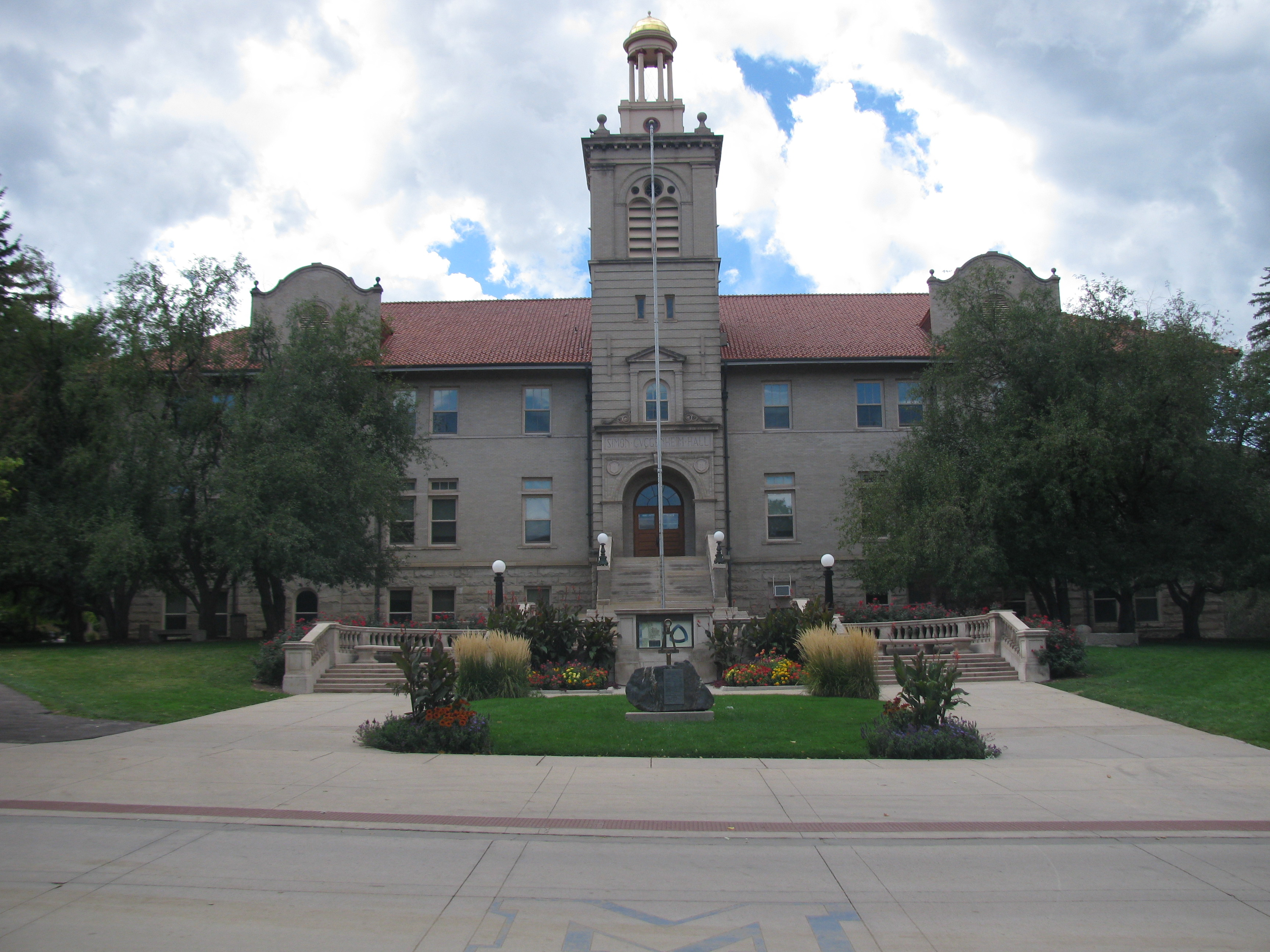
Colorado School of Mines

- List of charter schools in Colorado
- List of colleges and universities in Colorado
- List of Colorado boards of cooperative educational services
- List of environmental education centers in Colorado
- List of high schools in Colorado
- List of school districts in Colorado

=== Geography lists ===
==== Lists of geographic features ====
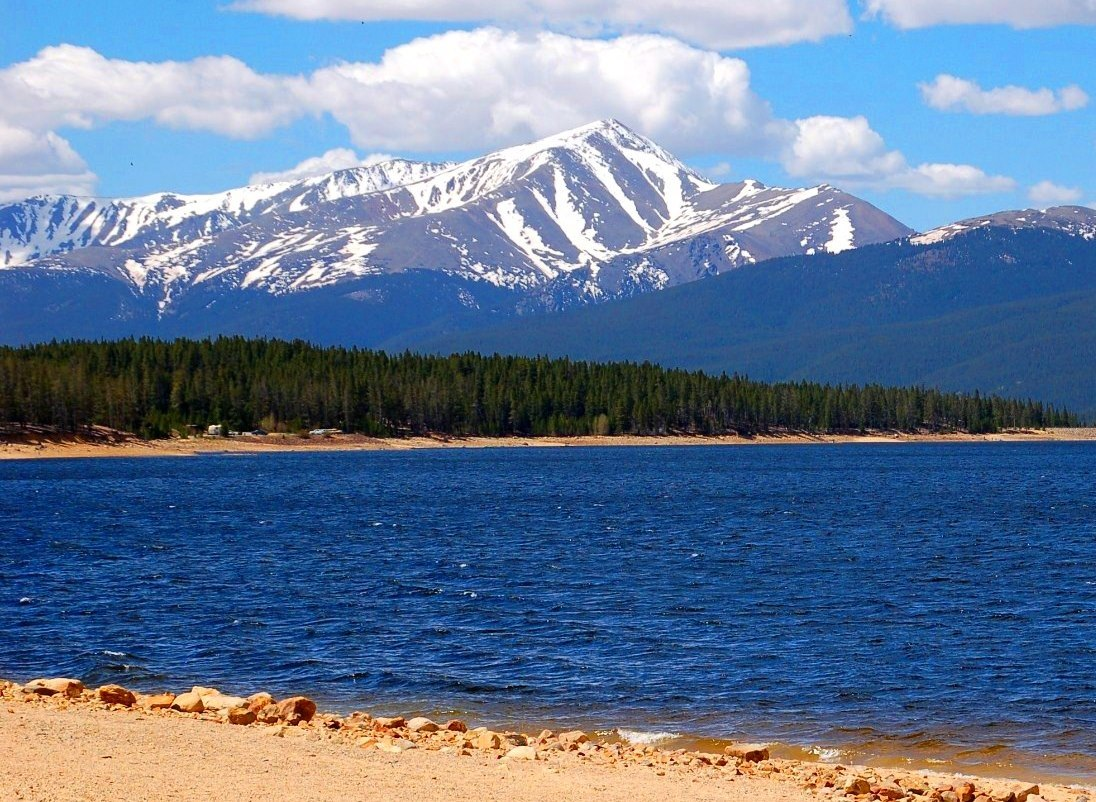
The summit of Mount Elbert at 14,440 feet (4,401.2 m) is the highest point of the Rocky Mountains and Colorado.

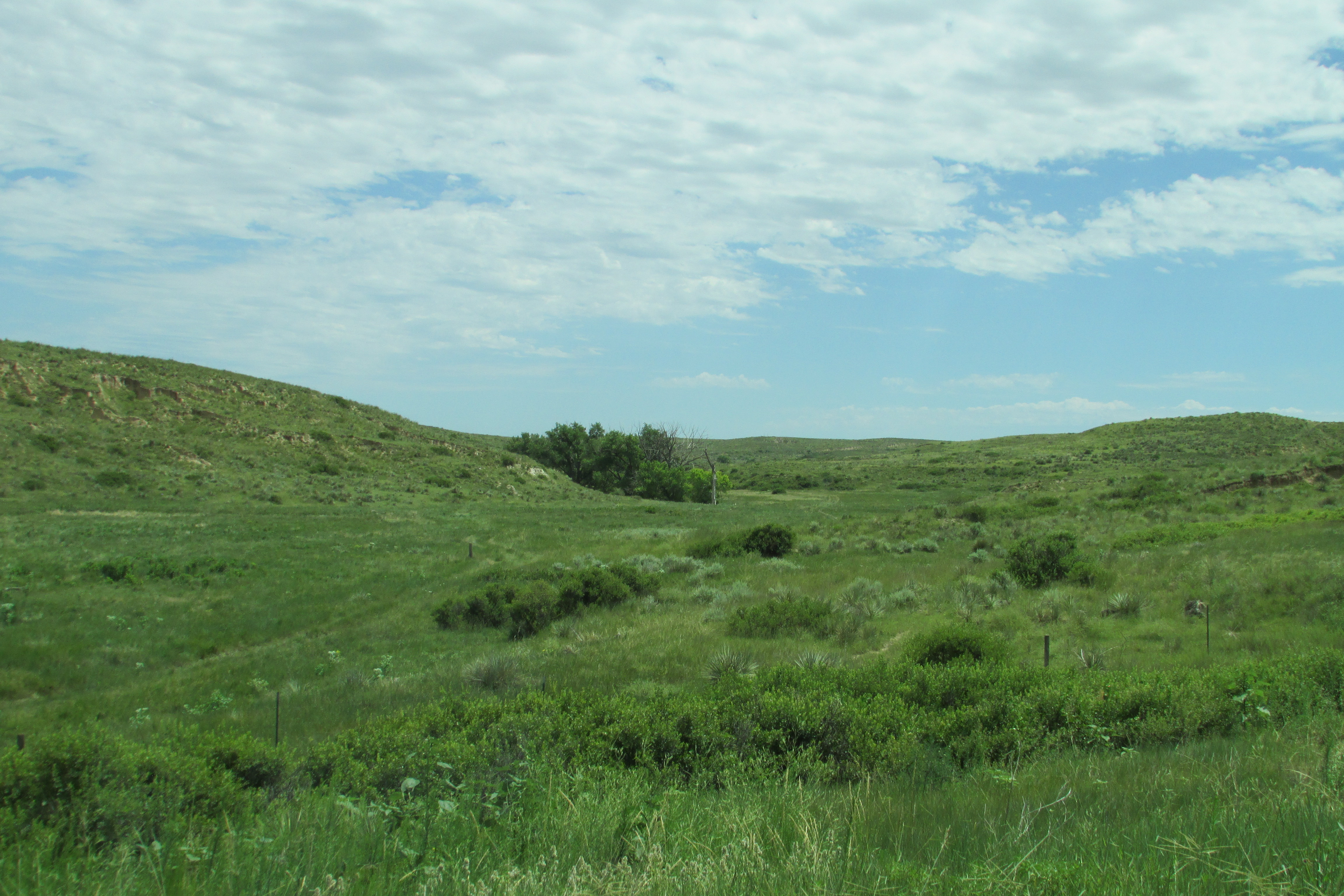
The point where the Arikaree River flows out of the state is the lowest point in Colorado at 3,317 feet (1,011 m).

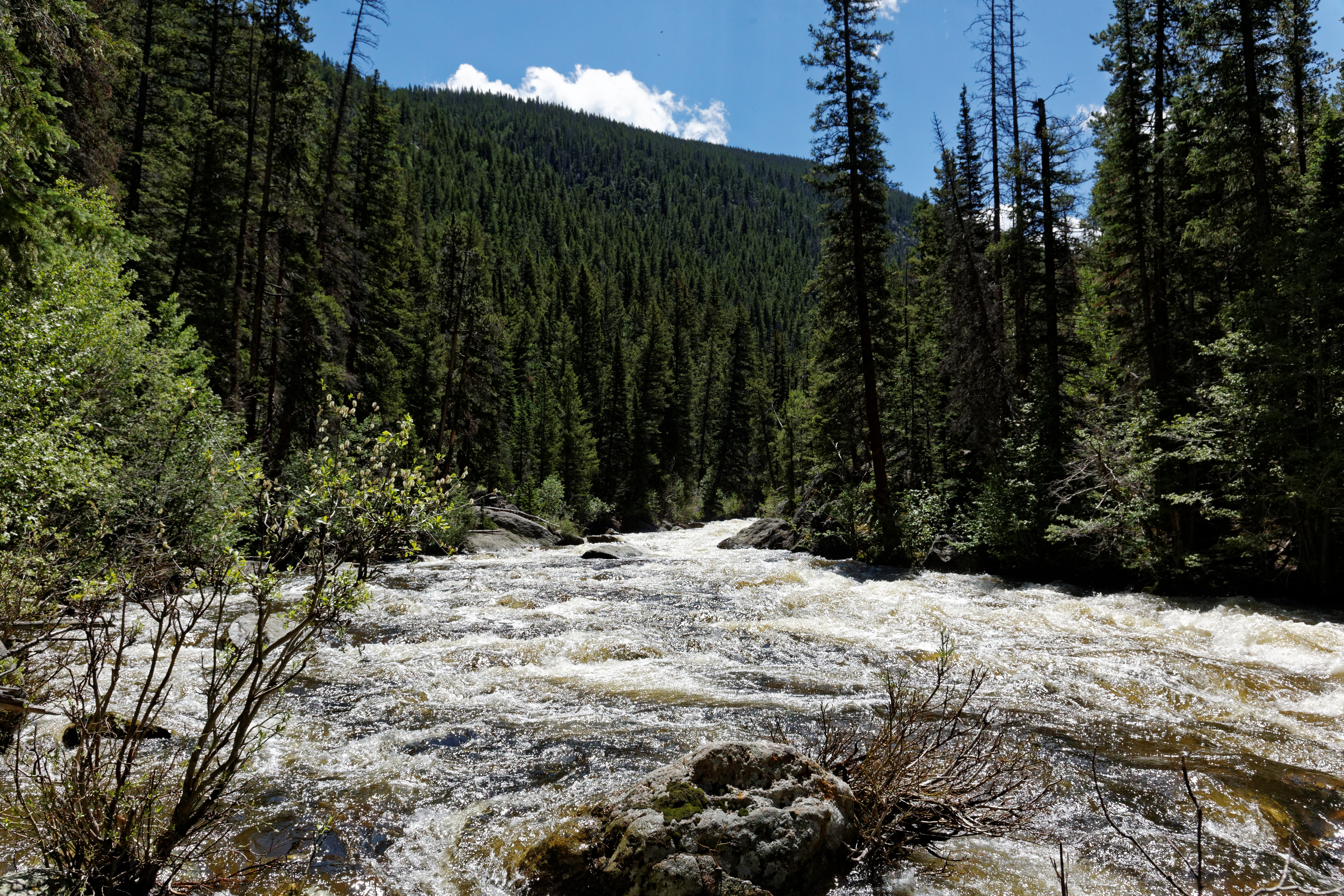
The Cache la Poudre Wild and Scenic River

- List of Colorado placenames of Native American origin
- List of fossiliferous stratigraphic units in Colorado
- List of hot springs in Colorado
- List of lakes of Colorado
  - List of dams and reservoirs in Colorado
  - List of largest reservoirs in Colorado
- List of mountains in Colorado
  - List of mountain peaks of Colorado
    - List of Colorado fourteeners
    - List of the highest major summits of Colorado
    - List of the major 4000-meter summits of Colorado
    - List of the most isolated major summits of Colorado
    - List of the most prominent summits of Colorado
  - List of mountain peaks of the Rocky Mountains
    - List of extreme summits of the Rocky Mountains
    - List of the highest major summits of the Rocky Mountains
    - List of the most isolated major summits of the Rocky Mountains
    - List of the most prominent summits of the Rocky Mountains
  - List of mountain peaks of the Southern Rocky Mountains
  - List of mountain peaks of the United States
- List of mountain passes in Colorado
  - List of passes of the Rocky Mountains
- List of mountain ranges of Colorado
  - List of mountain ranges of the Southern Rocky Mountains
- List of rivers of Colorado
  - List of drainage basins in Colorado
  - List of crossings of the Arkansas River
  - List of crossings of the Rio Grande
  - List of tributaries of the Rio Grande
- List of waterfalls in Colorado

==== Lists of historic places ====
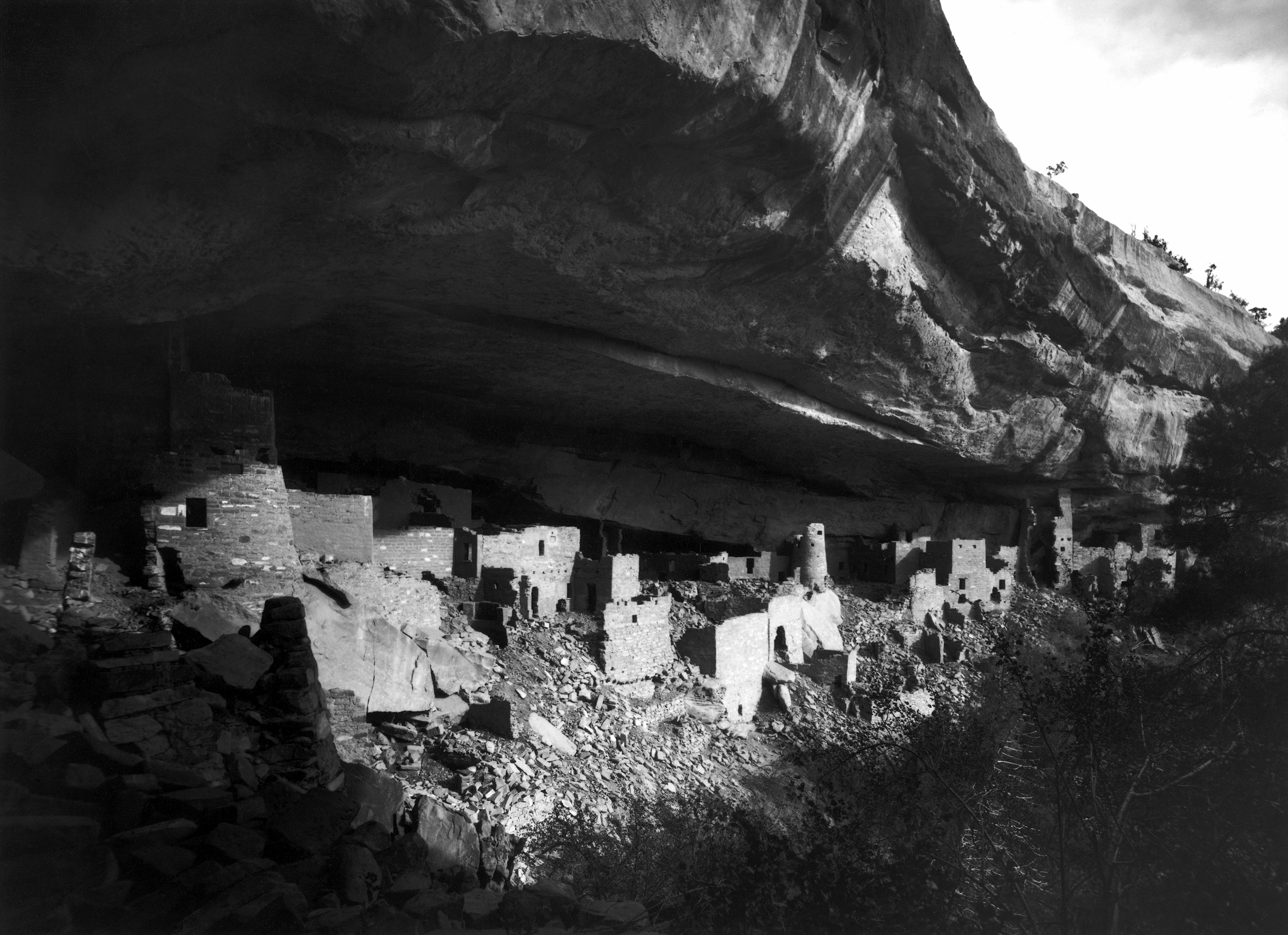
The ruins of the Cliff Palace on Mesa Verde, photographed by Gustaf Nordenskiöld in 1891

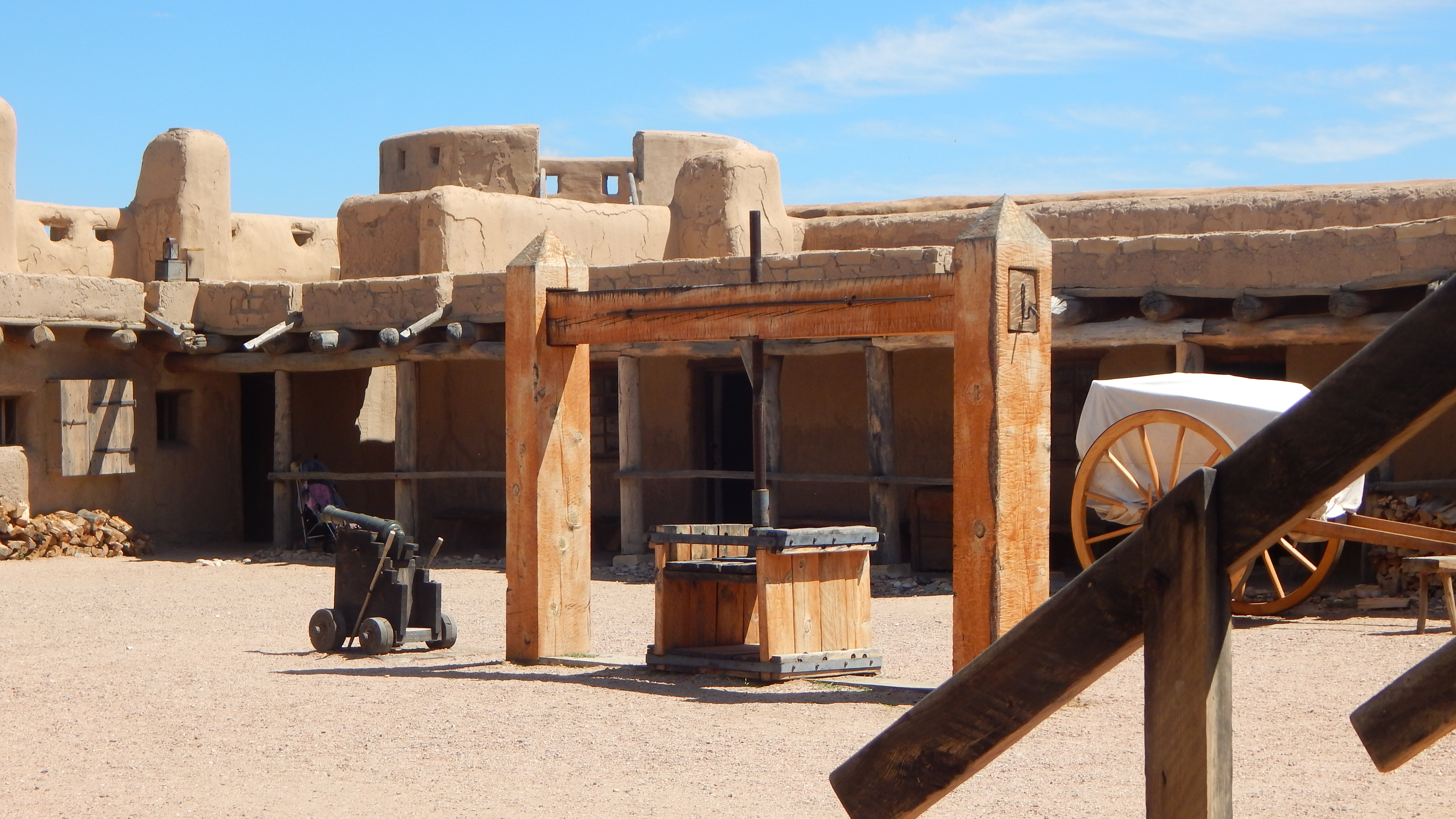
Bent's Old Fort National Historic Site

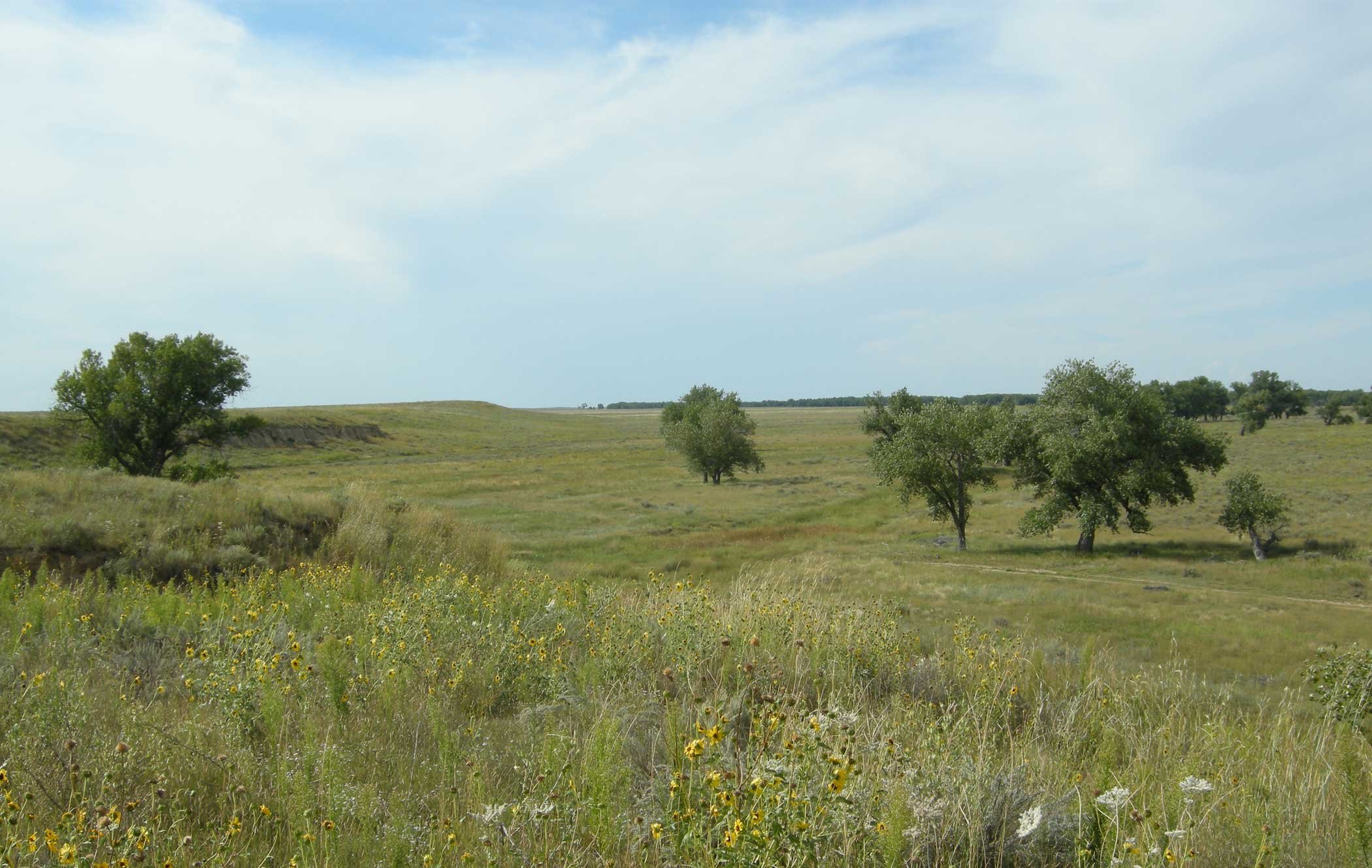
The Sand Creek Massacre National Historic Site

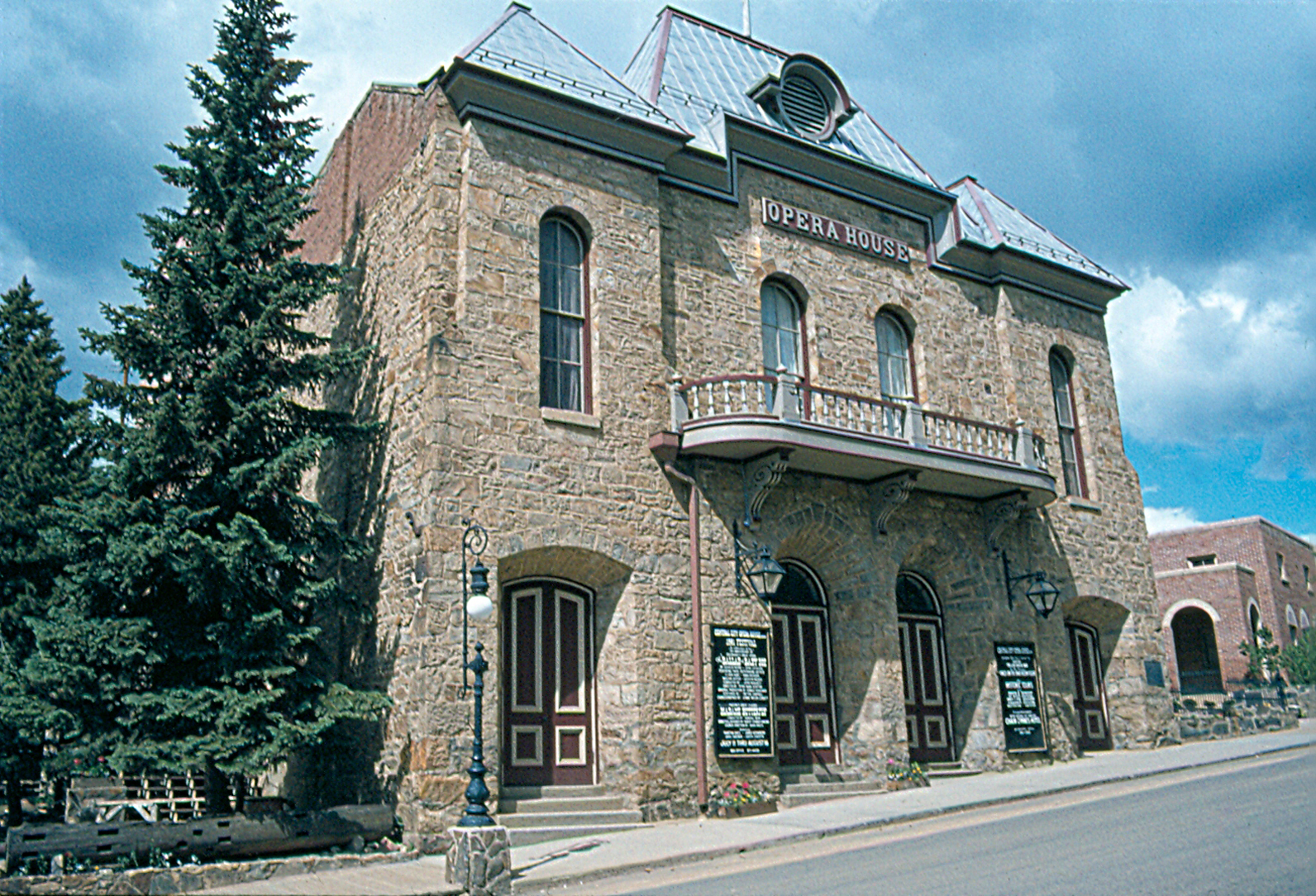
The Central City Opera House

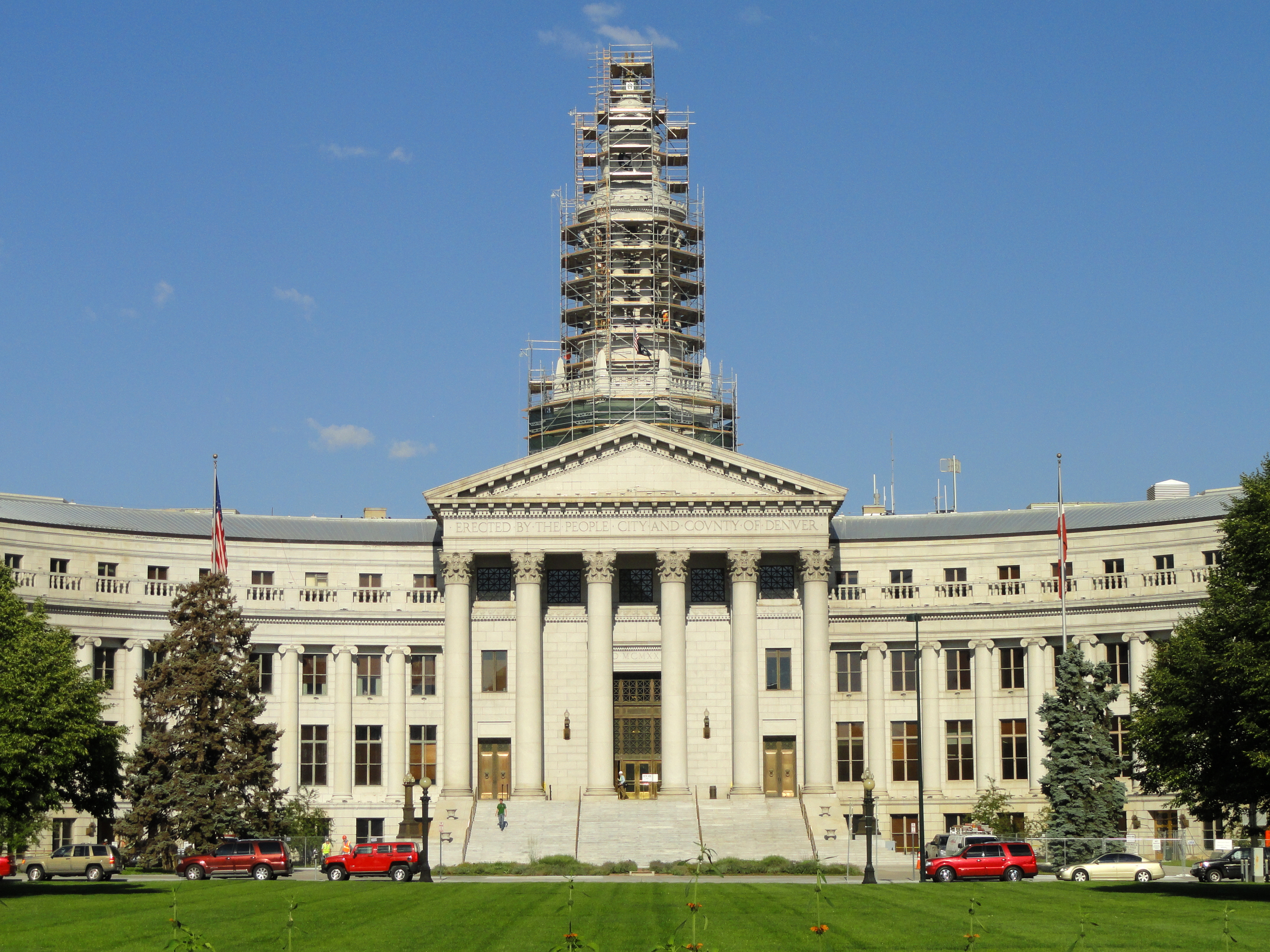
The Denver City and County Building

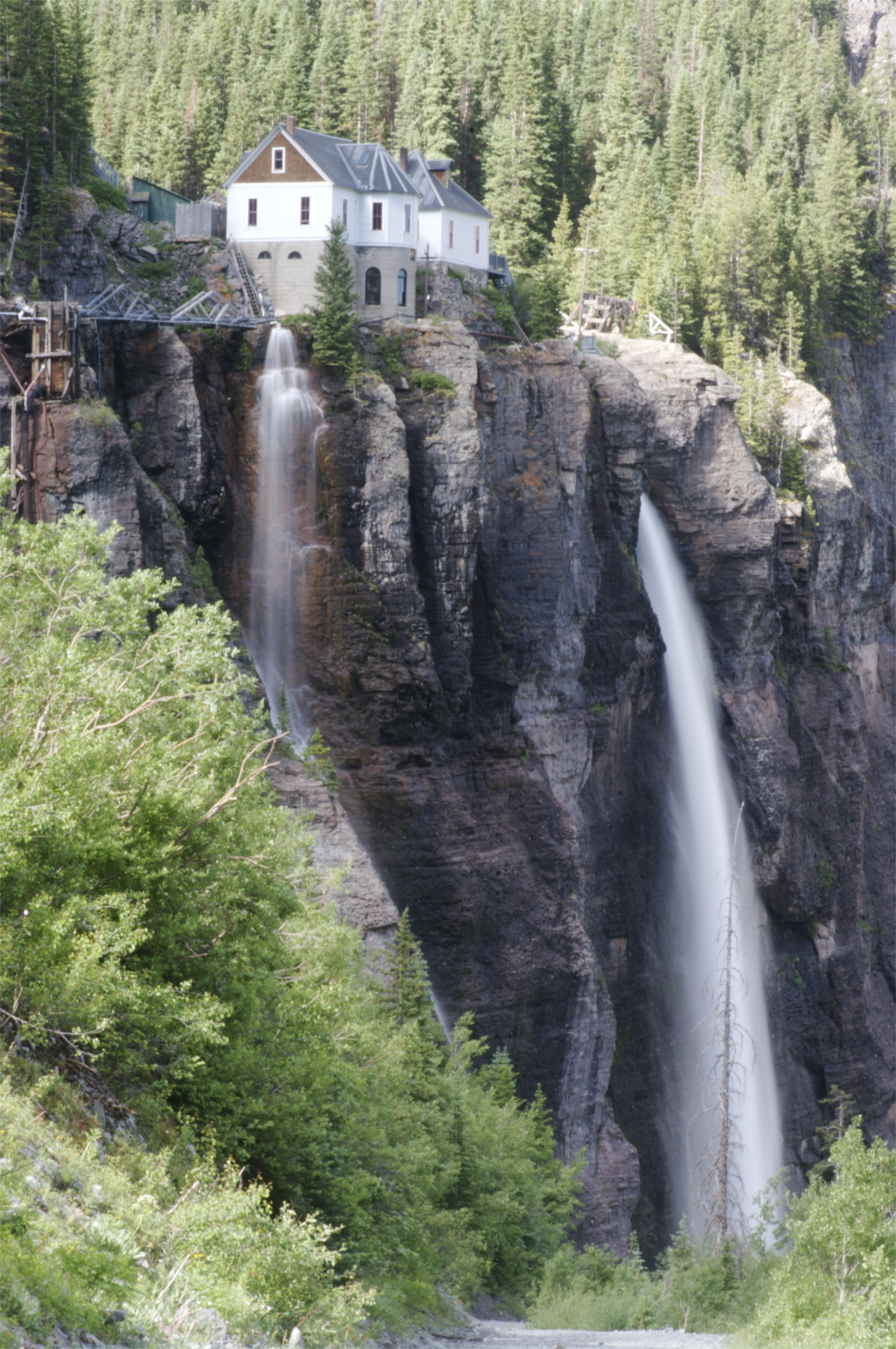
The Bridal Veil Powerhouse at Telluride

- List of forts in Colorado
- List of ghost towns in Colorado
- List of National Register of Historic Places in Colorado
  - List of bridges on the National Register of Historic Places in Colorado
  - List of National Register of Historic Places in Adams County, Colorado
  - List of National Register of Historic Places in Alamosa County, Colorado
  - List of National Register of Historic Places in Arapahoe County, Colorado
  - List of National Register of Historic Places in Archuleta County, Colorado
  - List of National Register of Historic Places in Baca County, Colorado
  - List of National Register of Historic Places in Bent County, Colorado
  - List of National Register of Historic Places in Boulder County, Colorado
  - List of National Register of Historic Places in Broomfield, Colorado
  - List of National Register of Historic Places in Chaffee County, Colorado
  - List of National Register of Historic Places in Cheyenne County, Colorado
  - List of National Register of Historic Places in Clear Creek County, Colorado
  - List of National Register of Historic Places in Conejos County, Colorado
  - List of National Register of Historic Places in Costilla County, Colorado
  - List of National Register of Historic Places in Crowley County, Colorado
  - List of National Register of Historic Places in Custer County, Colorado
  - List of National Register of Historic Places in Delta County, Colorado
  - List of National Register of Historic Places in Denver
    - List of National Register of Historic Places in downtown Denver
    - List of National Register of Historic Places in northeast Denver
    - List of National Register of Historic Places in southeast Denver
    - List of National Register of Historic Places in west Denver
  - List of National Register of Historic Places in Dolores County, Colorado
  - List of National Register of Historic Places in Douglas County, Colorado
  - List of National Register of Historic Places in Eagle County, Colorado
  - List of National Register of Historic Places in El Paso County, Colorado
  - List of National Register of Historic Places in Elbert County, Colorado
  - List of National Register of Historic Places in Fremont County, Colorado
  - List of National Register of Historic Places in Garfield County, Colorado
  - List of National Register of Historic Places in Gilpin County, Colorado
  - List of National Register of Historic Places in Grand County, Colorado
  - List of National Register of Historic Places in Gunnison County, Colorado
  - List of National Register of Historic Places in Hinsdale County, Colorado
  - List of National Register of Historic Places in Huerfano County, Colorado
  - List of National Register of Historic Places in Jackson County, Colorado
  - List of National Register of Historic Places in Jefferson County, Colorado
  - List of National Register of Historic Places in Kiowa County, Colorado
  - List of National Register of Historic Places in Kit Carson County, Colorado
  - List of National Register of Historic Places in La Plata County, Colorado
  - List of National Register of Historic Places in Lake County, Colorado
  - List of National Register of Historic Places in Larimer County, Colorado
  - List of National Register of Historic Places in Las Animas County, Colorado
  - List of National Register of Historic Places in Lincoln County, Colorado
  - List of National Register of Historic Places in Logan County, Colorado
  - List of National Register of Historic Places in Mesa County, Colorado
  - List of National Register of Historic Places in Mineral County, Colorado
  - List of National Register of Historic Places in Moffat County, Colorado
  - List of National Register of Historic Places in Montezuma County, Colorado
  - List of National Register of Historic Places in Montrose County, Colorado
  - List of National Register of Historic Places in Morgan County, Colorado
  - List of National Register of Historic Places in Otero County, Colorado
  - List of National Register of Historic Places in Ouray County, Colorado
  - List of National Register of Historic Places in Park County, Colorado
  - List of National Register of Historic Places in Phillips County, Colorado
  - List of National Register of Historic Places in Pitkin County, Colorado
  - List of National Register of Historic Places in Prowers County, Colorado
  - List of National Register of Historic Places in Pueblo County, Colorado
  - List of National Register of Historic Places in Rio Blanco County, Colorado
  - List of National Register of Historic Places in Rio Grande County, Colorado
  - List of National Register of Historic Places in Routt County, Colorado
  - List of National Register of Historic Places in Saguache County, Colorado
  - List of National Register of Historic Places in San Juan County, Colorado
  - List of National Register of Historic Places in San Miguel County, Colorado
  - List of National Register of Historic Places in Sedgwick County, Colorado
  - List of National Register of Historic Places in Summit County, Colorado
  - List of National Register of Historic Places in Teller County, Colorado
  - List of National Register of Historic Places in Washington County, Colorado
  - List of National Register of Historic Places in Weld County, Colorado
  - List of National Register of Historic Places in Yuma County, Colorado
  - List of post office buildings on the National Register of Historic Places in Colorado
- List of Native American reservations in Colorado
- List of post offices in Colorado
- List of trading posts in Colorado

==== Lists of populated places ====
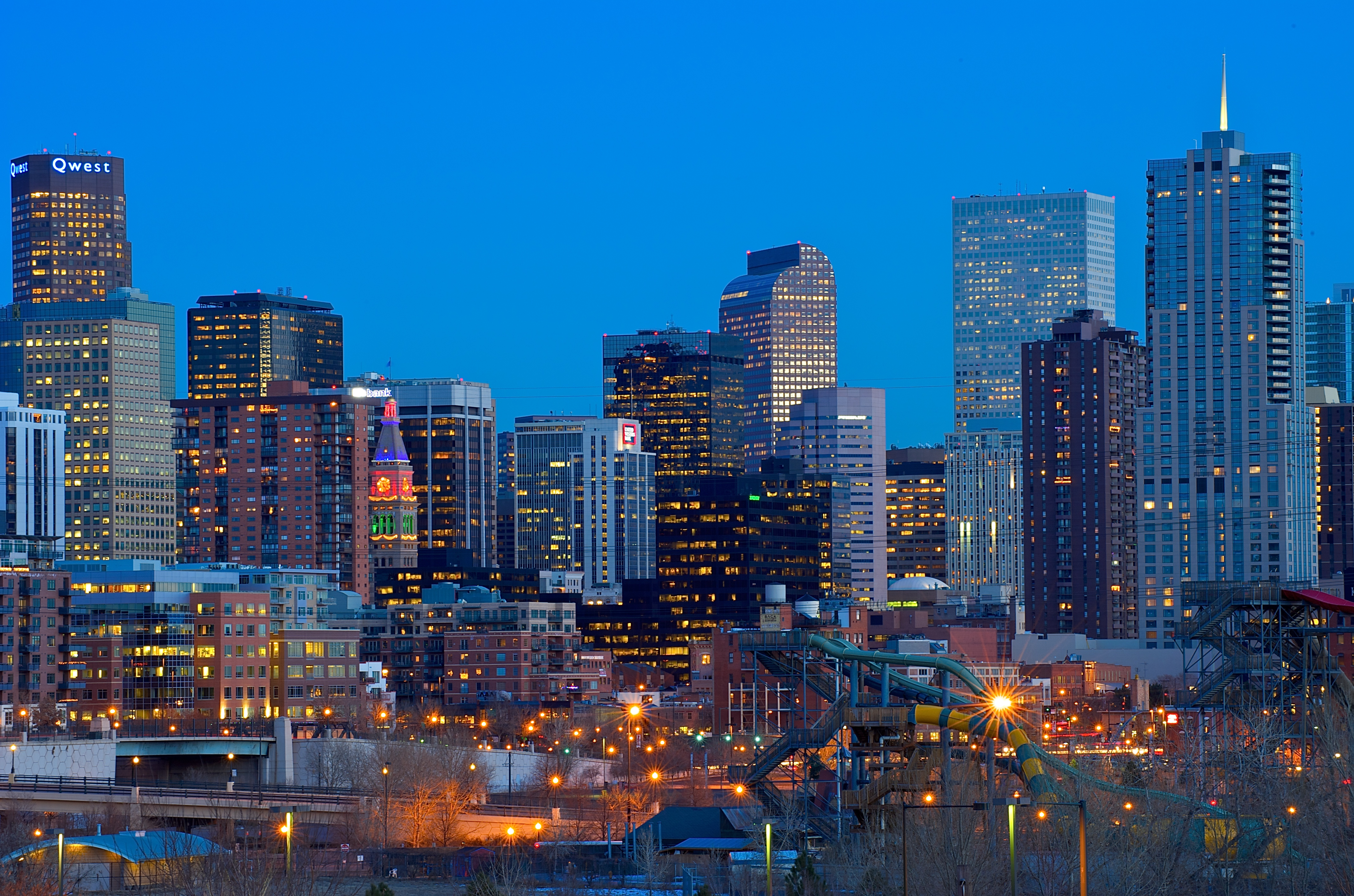
Denver is the capital of Colorado.

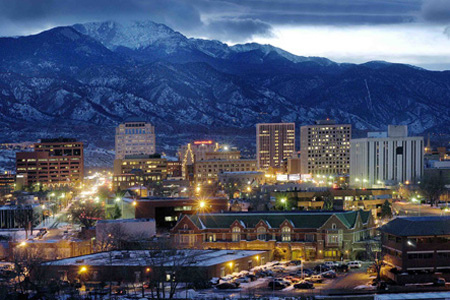
Colorado Springs is the second most populous Colorado city.

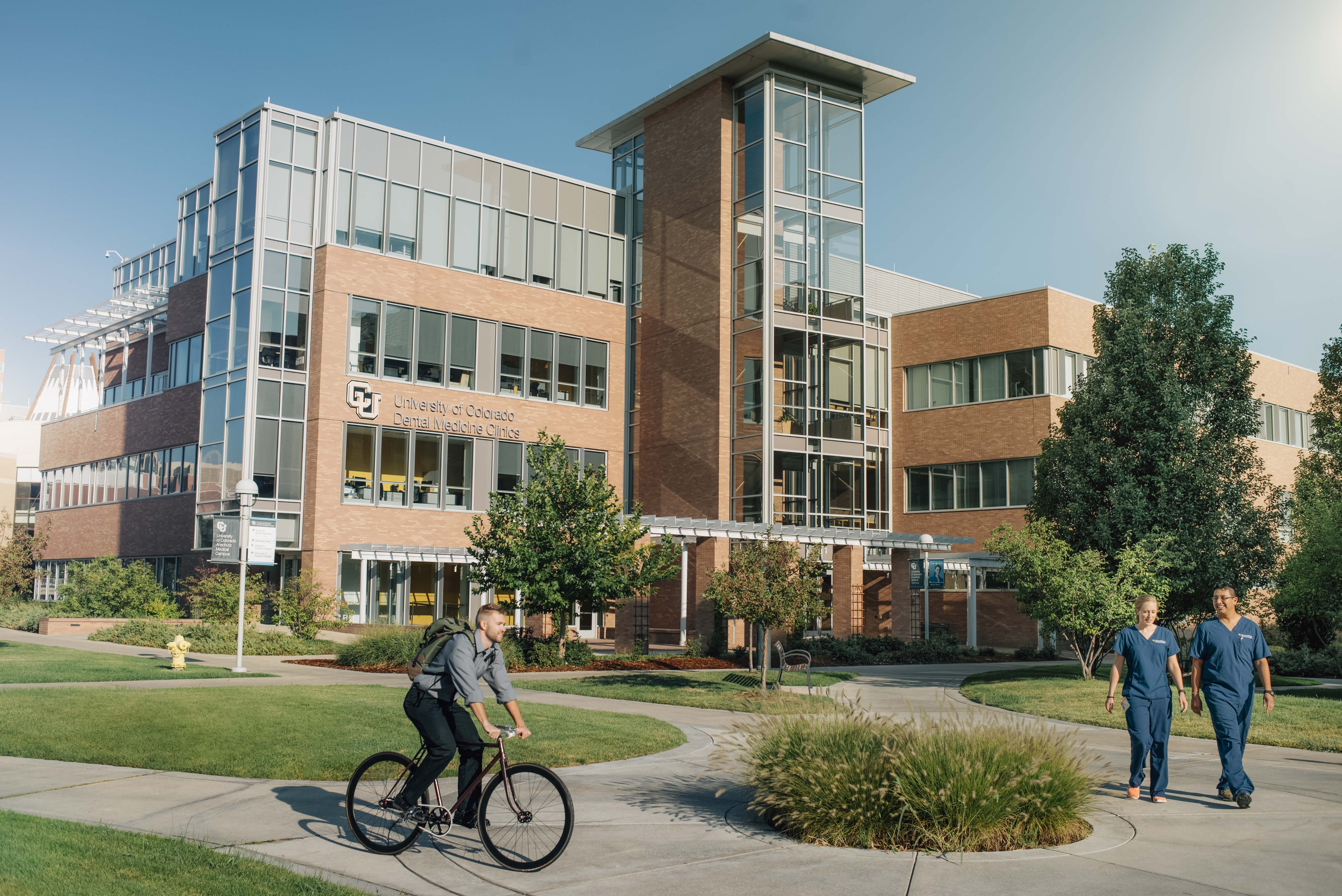
Aurora is the third most populous Colorado city.

- List of populated places in Colorado
  - List of populated places in Colorado by county
- List of census-designated places in Colorado
  - List of census-designated places in more than one Colorado county
- List of counties in Colorado
  - List of Colorado counties by per capita income
  - List of Colorado counties by population
  - List of Colorado counties by socioeconomic factors
  - List of Colorado counties by statistical area
  - List of Colorado county high points
  - List of Colorado municipalities by county
  - List of Colorado populated places by county
  - List of county courthouses in Colorado
  - List of county seats in Colorado
- List of Ancestral Puebloan dwellings in Colorado
- List of forts in Colorado
- List of ghost towns in Colorado
- List of military installations in Colorado
- List of municipalities in Colorado
  - List of Colorado municipalities by county
  - List of Colorado municipalities by elevation
  - List of Colorado municipalities by population
  - List of Colorado municipalities in multiple counties
  - List of former municipalities in Colorado
  - List of adjectivals and demonyms for Colorado cities
  - List of neighborhoods in Denver
- List of Native American reservations in Colorado
- List of post offices in Colorado
  - List of ZIP codes in Colorado
- List of statistical areas in Colorado
- List of telephone area codes in Colorado
- List of trading posts in Colorado

==== Lists of protected places ====
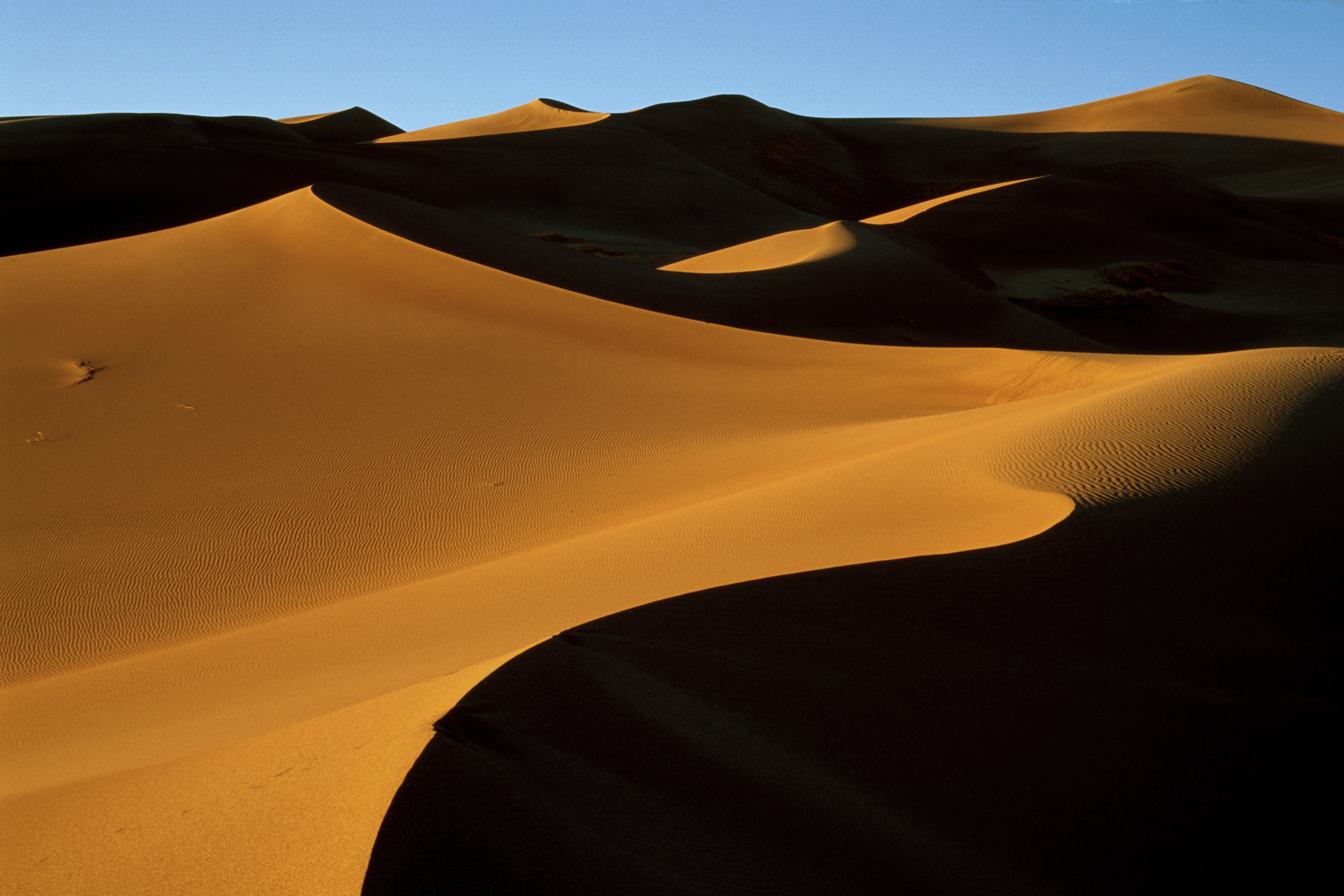
Great Sand Dunes National Park and Preserve

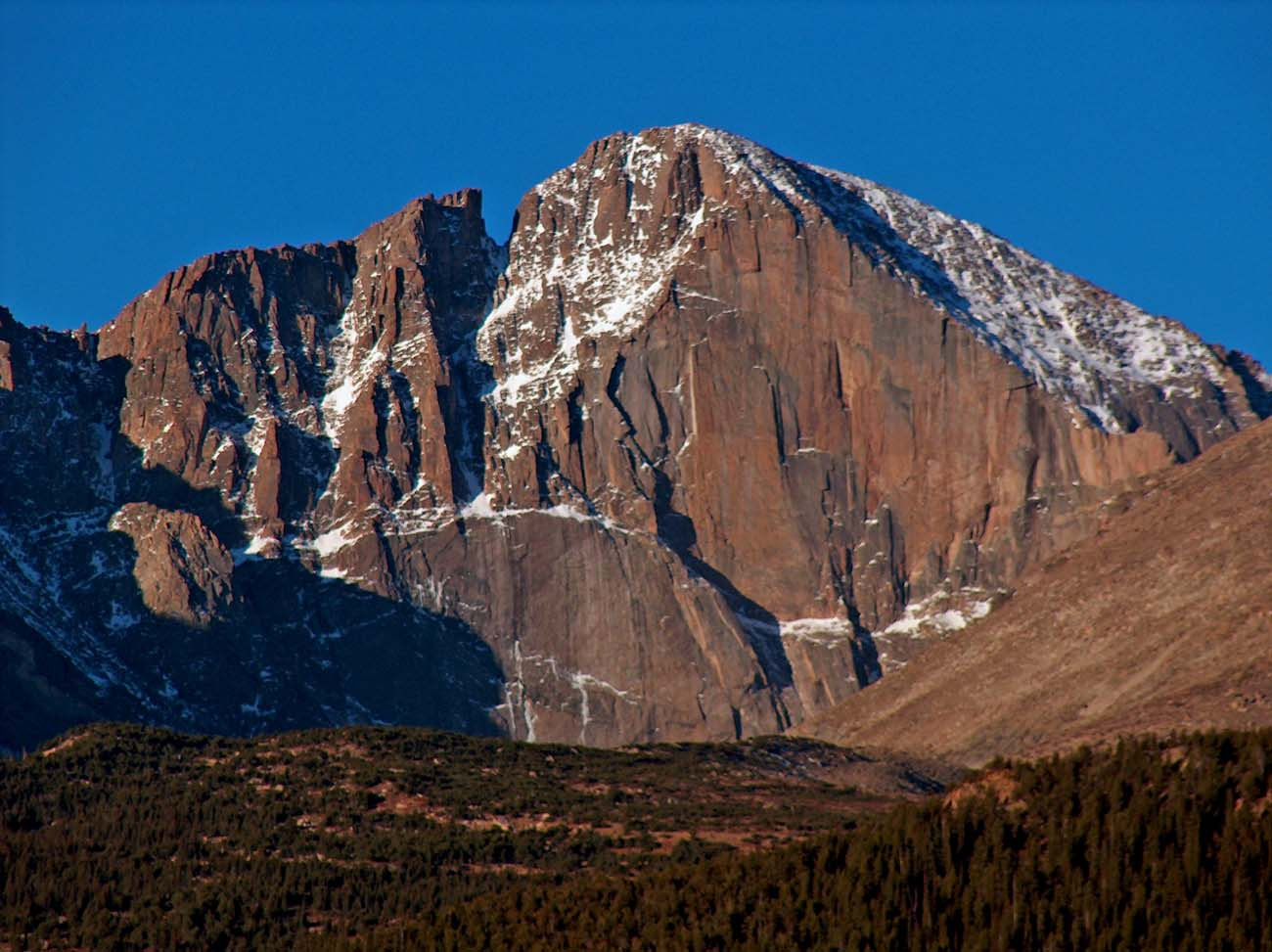
Longs Peak in Rocky Mountain National Park

- List of protected areas of Colorado
  - List of Areas of Critical Environmental Concern in Colorado
  - List of Colorado natural areas
  - List of Colorado state forests
  - List of Colorado state parks
  - List of Colorado state wildlife areas
  - List of national conservation areas in Colorado
  - List of national conservation lands in Colorado
  - List of national forests in Colorado
  - List of national grasslands in Colorado
  - List of national heritage areas in Colorado
  - List of National Historic Landmarks in Colorado
  - List of national historic sites in Colorado
  - List of national historic trails in Colorado
  - List of national monuments in Colorado
  - List of national natural landmarks in Colorado
  - List of national parks in Colorado
  - List of national recreation areas in Colorado
  - List of National Recreation Trails in Colorado
  - List of national scenic trails in Colorado
  - List of national wildernesses in Colorado
  - List of national wildlife refuges in Colorado
  - List of regional trails in Colorado
  - List of Superfund sites in Colorado
  - List of wild and scenic rivers in Colorado

=== Government lists ===
The Flag of the State of Colorado

The Great Seal of the State of Colorado

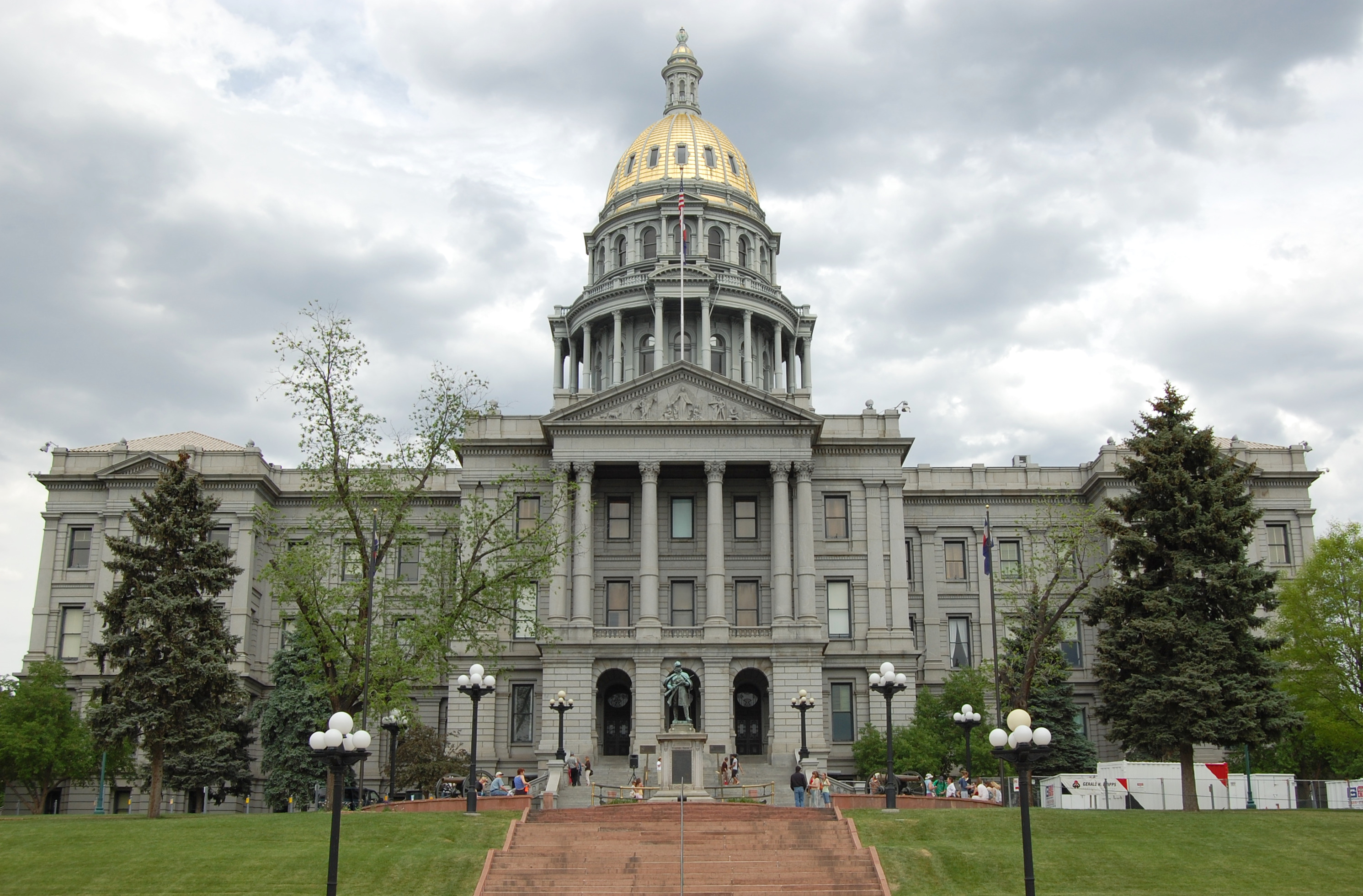
The Colorado State Capitol in Denver

- List of Colorado state symbols
- List of elected state officers of Colorado
  - List of governors of Colorado
    - List of governors of the State of Colorado
    - List of governors of the Territory of Colorado
    - List of governors of the Territory of Jefferson
  - List of lieutenant governors of the State of Colorado
  - List of secretaries of the State of Colorado
    - List of secretaries of the Territory of Colorado
  - List of attorneys general of the State of Colorado
    - List of attorneys general of the Territory of Colorado
  - List of treasurers of the State of Colorado
    - List of treasurers of the Territory of Colorado
- List of Colorado legislatures
  - List of general assemblies of the State of Colorado
    - List of Colorado state senators
    - List of Colorado state representatives
  - List of legislative assemblies of the Territory of Colorado
- List of justices of the Colorado Supreme Court
- List of Colorado's congressional delegations
  - List of United States senators from Colorado
  - List of United States representatives from Colorado
- List of federal lands in Colorado
- List of law enforcement agencies in Colorado
- List of mayors of Denver
- List of United States federal courthouses in Colorado

=== History lists ===
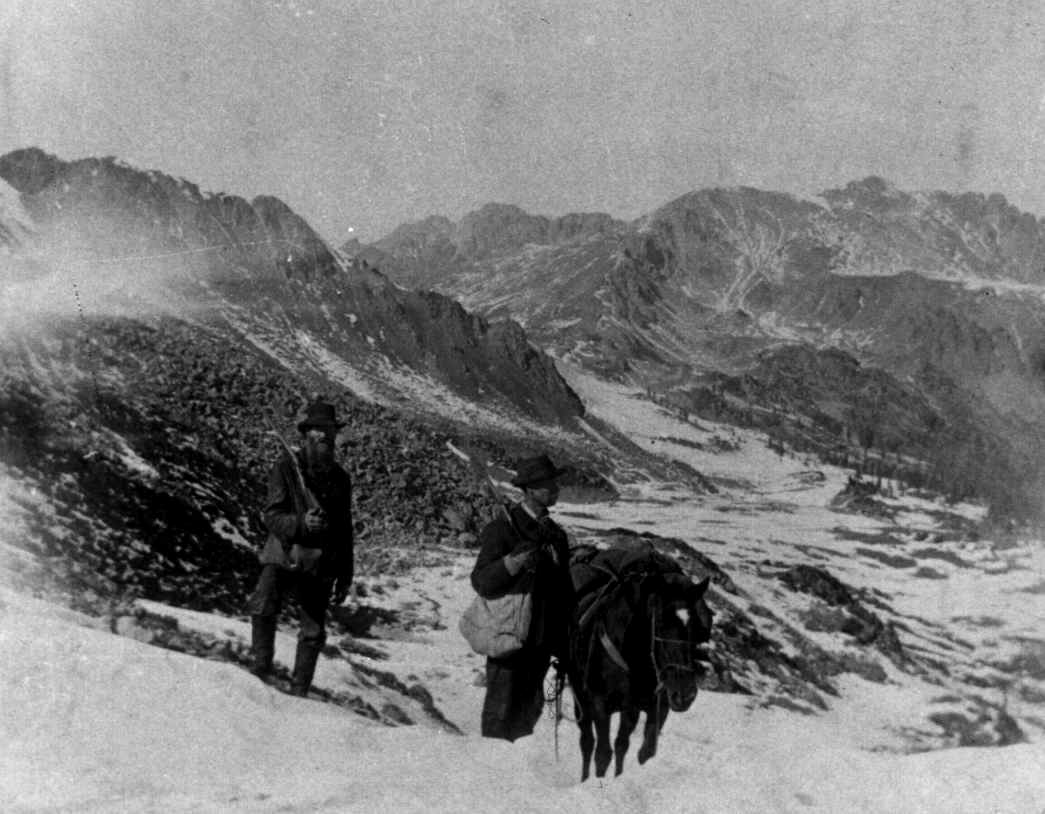
Two prospectors of the Pike's Peak Gold Rush

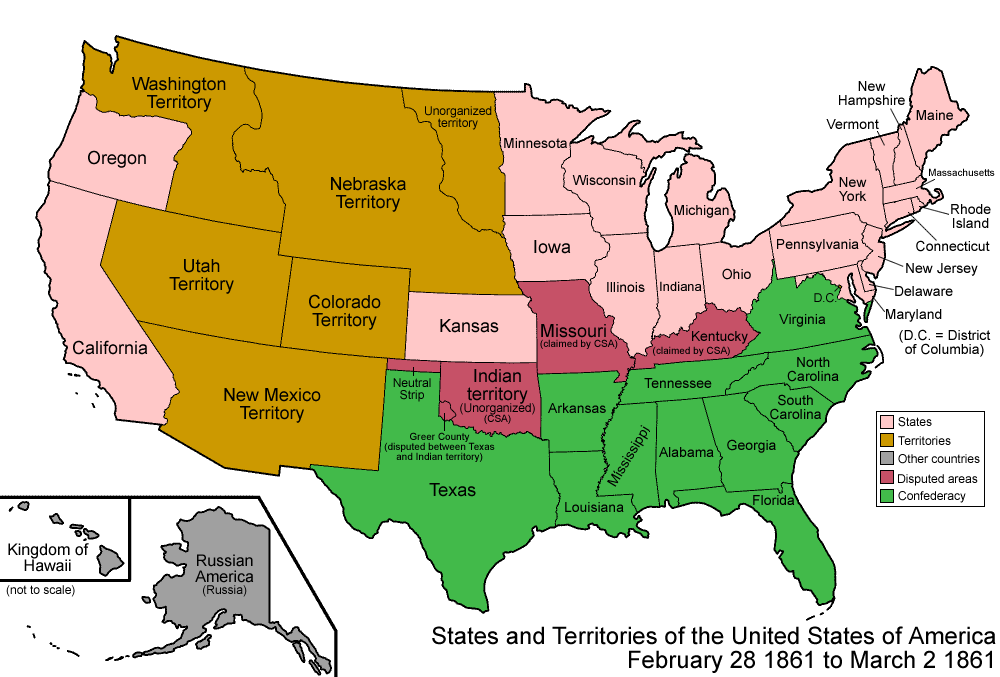
A map of the United States when the Territory of Colorado was created on February 28, 1861

- List of Ancestral Puebloan dwellings in Colorado
- List of battles fought in Colorado
- List of Colorado ballot measures
- List of Colorado Territory Civil War units
- List of Colorado counties by population
- List of first minority male lawyers and judges in Colorado
- List of first women lawyers and judges in Colorado
- List of forts in Colorado
- List of ghost towns in Colorado
- List of Manitou Springs Historic District buildings
- List of municipalities in Colorado
- List of National Register of Historic Places in Colorado
- List of post offices in Colorado
- List of the oldest buildings in Colorado
- List of prehistoric sites in Colorado
- List of territorial claims and designations in Colorado
- List of trading posts in Colorado
- List of Colorado wildfires
- Timeline of Colorado history
  - Timeline of Aurora, Colorado
  - Timeline of Boulder, Colorado
  - Timeline of Colorado Springs, Colorado
  - Timeline of Denver
  - Timeline of mining in Colorado

=== People lists ===
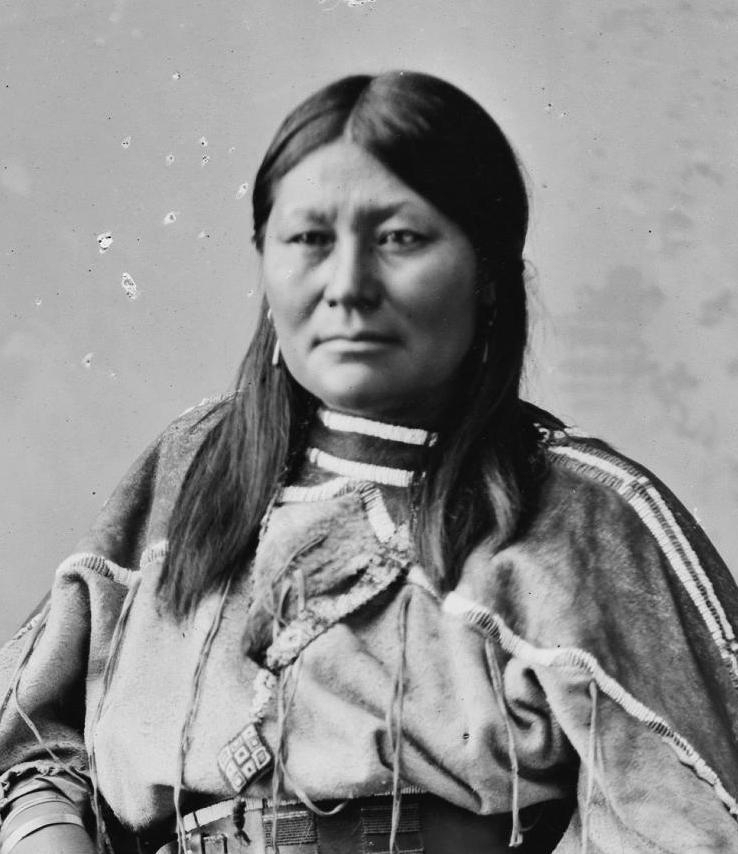
Chipeta (White Singing Bird) of the Uncompahgre Ute

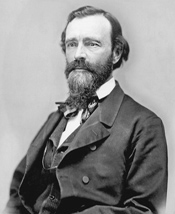
William Gilpin, first Governor of the Territory of Colorado

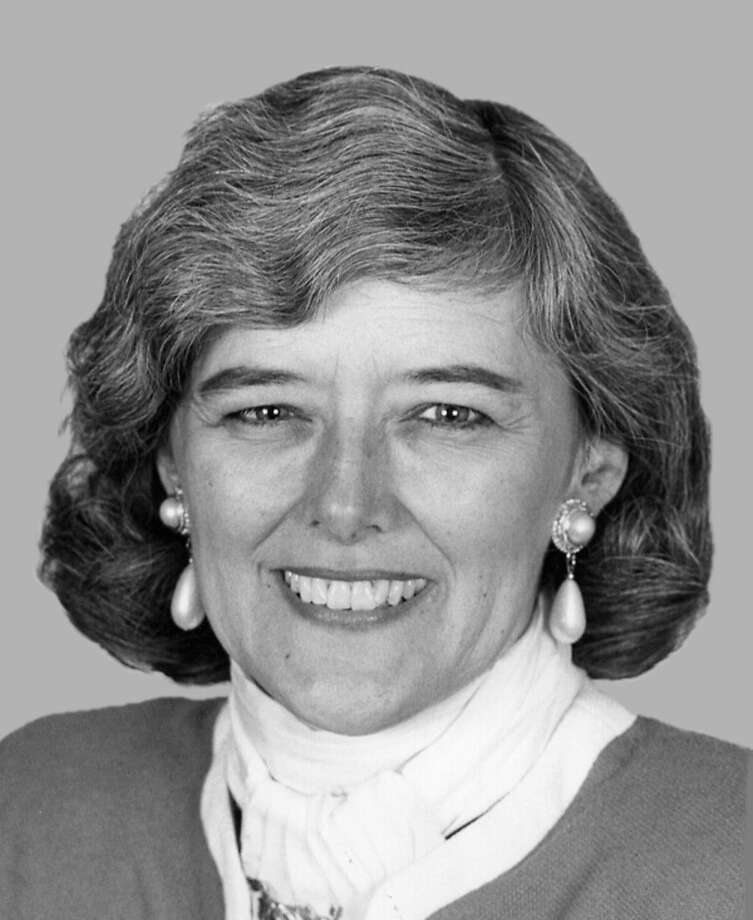
U.S. Representative Pat Schroeder

- List of people from Colorado
  - List of African-American honorees in the Colorado Hall of Fame
  - List of African American pioneers of Colorado
  - List of Colorado College people
  - List of Colorado School of Mines people
  - List of Colorado State University people
  - List of Colorado suffragists
  - List of Colorado Women's Hall of Fame honorees
  - List of Great American Beer Festival medalists
  - List of Mr. Colorado Basketball honorees
  - List of people from Arvada, Colorado
  - List of people from Aspen, Colorado
  - List of people from Aurora, Colorado
  - List of people from Boulder, Colorado
  - List of people from Colorado Springs, Colorado
  - List of people from Denver, Colorado
  - List of people from Durango, Colorado
  - List of people from Englewood, Colorado
  - List of people from Fort Collins, Colorado
  - List of people from Glenwood Springs, Colorado
  - List of people from Golden, Colorado
  - List of people from Greeley, Colorado
  - List of people from Highlands Ranch, Colorado
  - List of people from La Junta, Colorado
  - List of people from Lakewood, Colorado
  - List of people from Las Animas, Colorado
  - List of people from Littleton, Colorado
  - List of people from Trinidad, Colorado
  - List of people from Westminster, Colorado
  - List of people from Wheat Ridge, Colorado
  - List of United States Air Force Academy alumni
  - List of University of Colorado Boulder alumni
  - List of University of Denver alumni

=== Sports lists ===
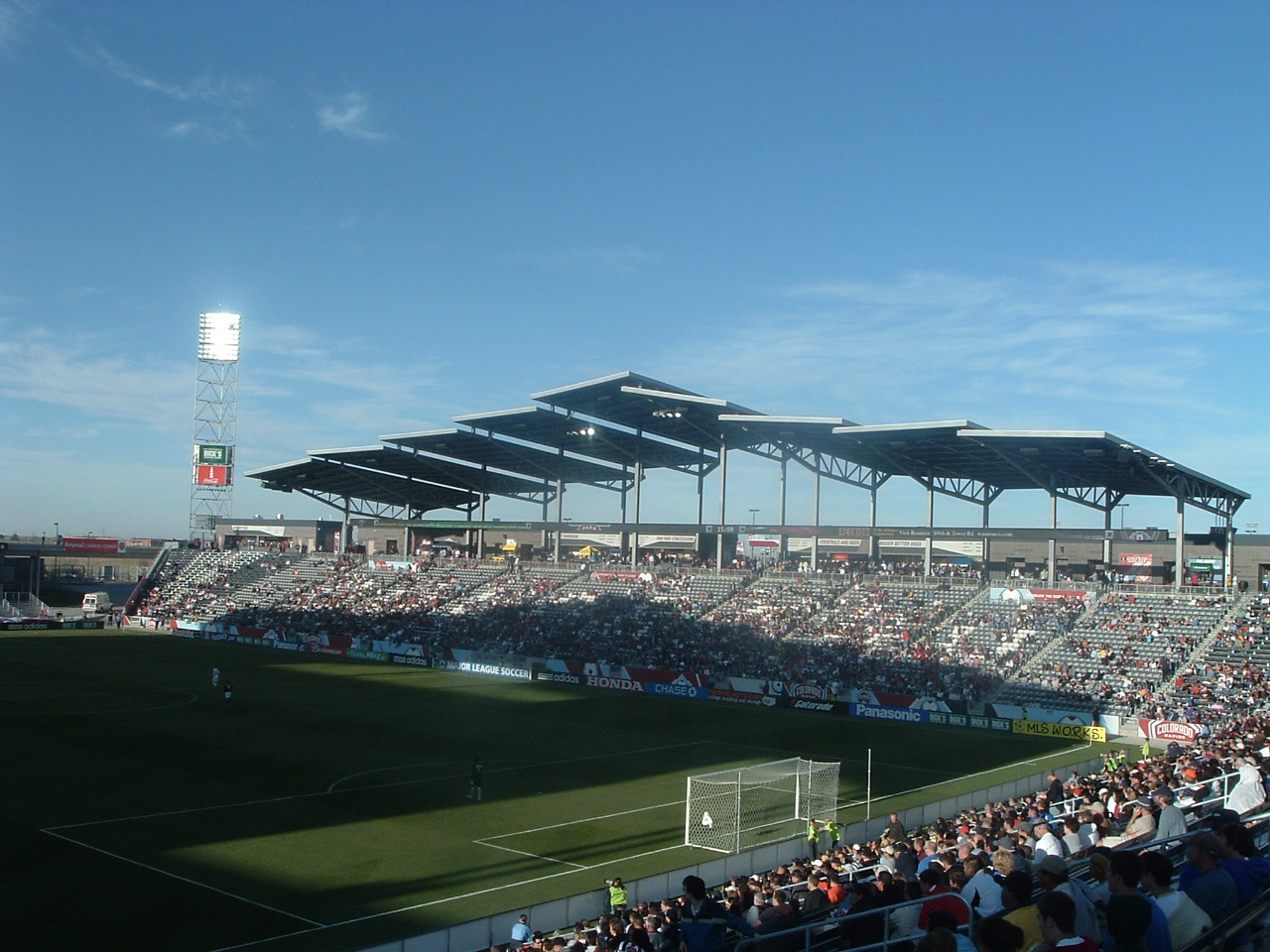
Dick's Sporting Goods Park, home of the Colorado Rapids

- List of sports in Colorado
  - List of sports in Denver

==== High School sports ====
- List of Mr. Colorado Basketball honorees

==== Collegiate sports ====
- List of college athletic programs in Colorado
- List of Colorado Football Association standings

===== Colorado College =====
- List of Colorado College Tigers men's ice hockey seasons

===== Colorado State University =====
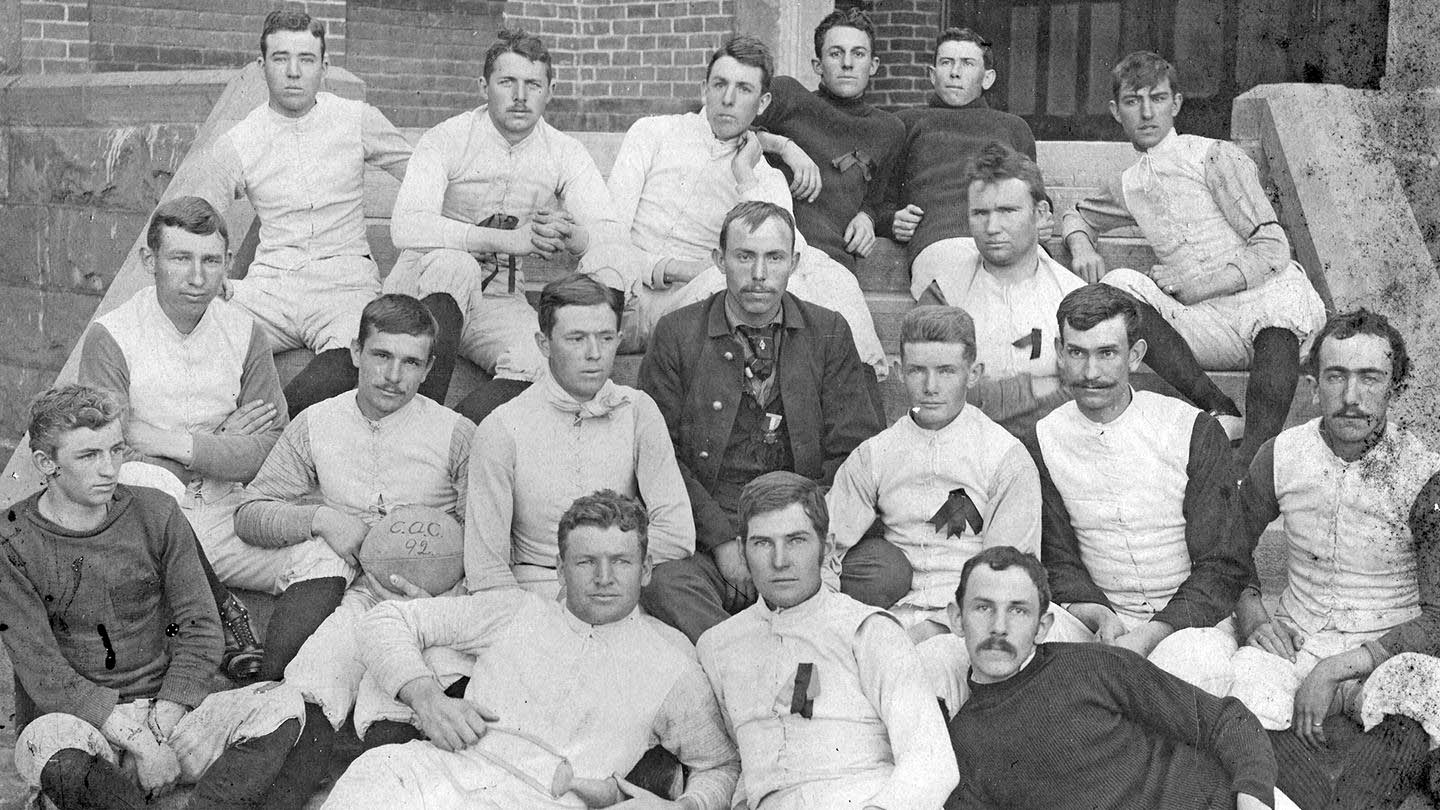
The 1893 Colorado Agricultural College football team

- List of Colorado State Rams football seasons
- List of Colorado State Rams in the NFL draft
- List of Colorado State Rams men's basketball head coaches

===== Colorado State University Pueblo =====
- List of CSU Pueblo ThunderWolves football seasons

===== United States Air Force Academy =====
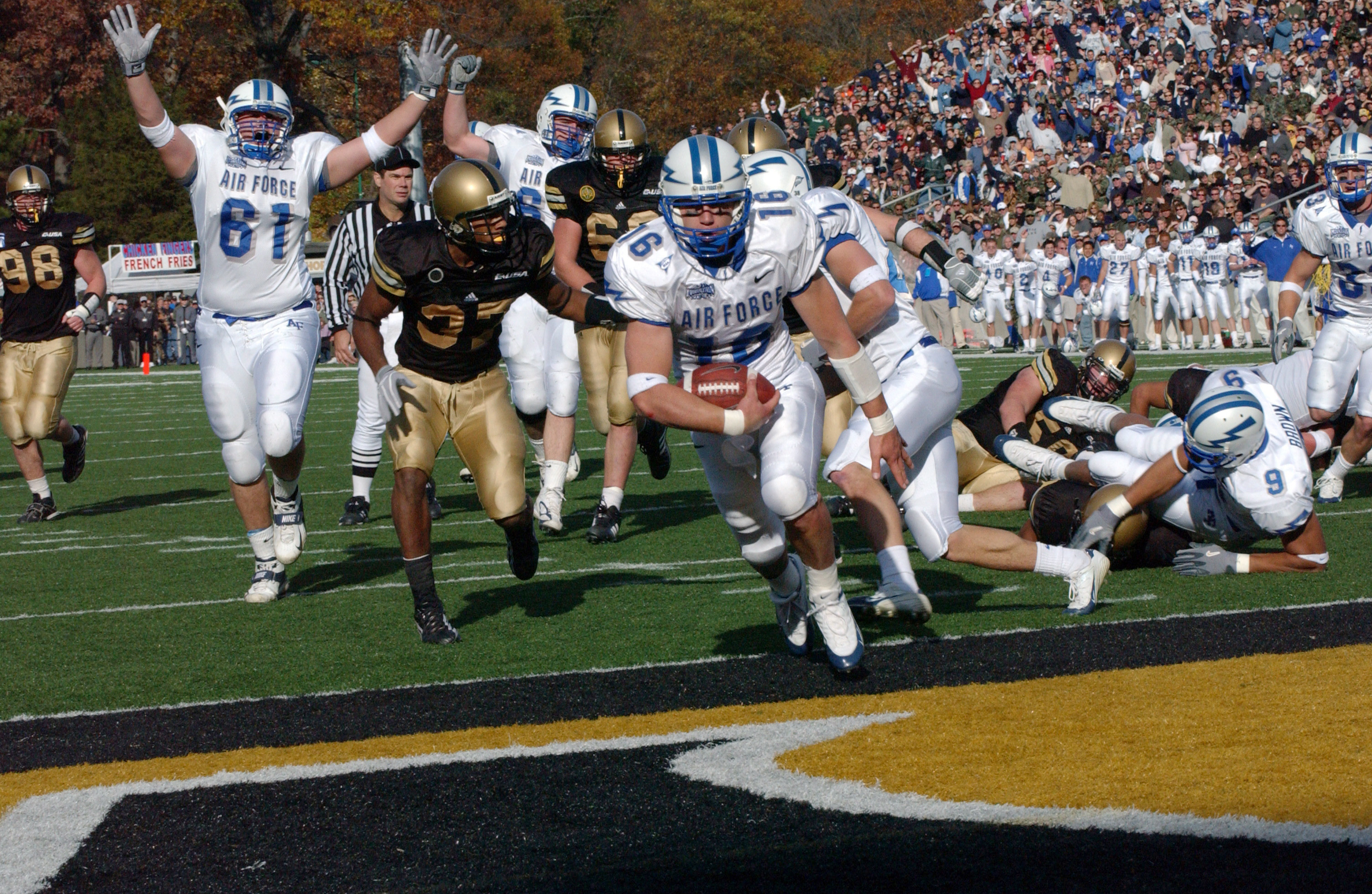
Air Force Falcons football team at West Point on November 6, 2004

- List of Air Force Falcons bowl games
- List of Air Force Falcons football seasons
- List of Air Force Falcons head football coaches
- List of Air Force Falcons in the NFL draft
- List of Air Force Falcons men's basketball head coaches
- List of Air Force Falcons men's ice hockey seasons

===== University of Colorado Boulder =====
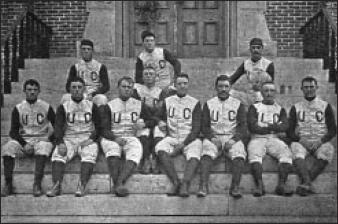
The 1890 University of Colorado football team

- List of Colorado Buffaloes bowl games
- List of Colorado Buffaloes football seasons
- List of Colorado Buffaloes head football coaches
- List of Colorado Buffaloes in the NFL draft
- List of Colorado Buffaloes men's basketball head coaches

===== University of Denver =====
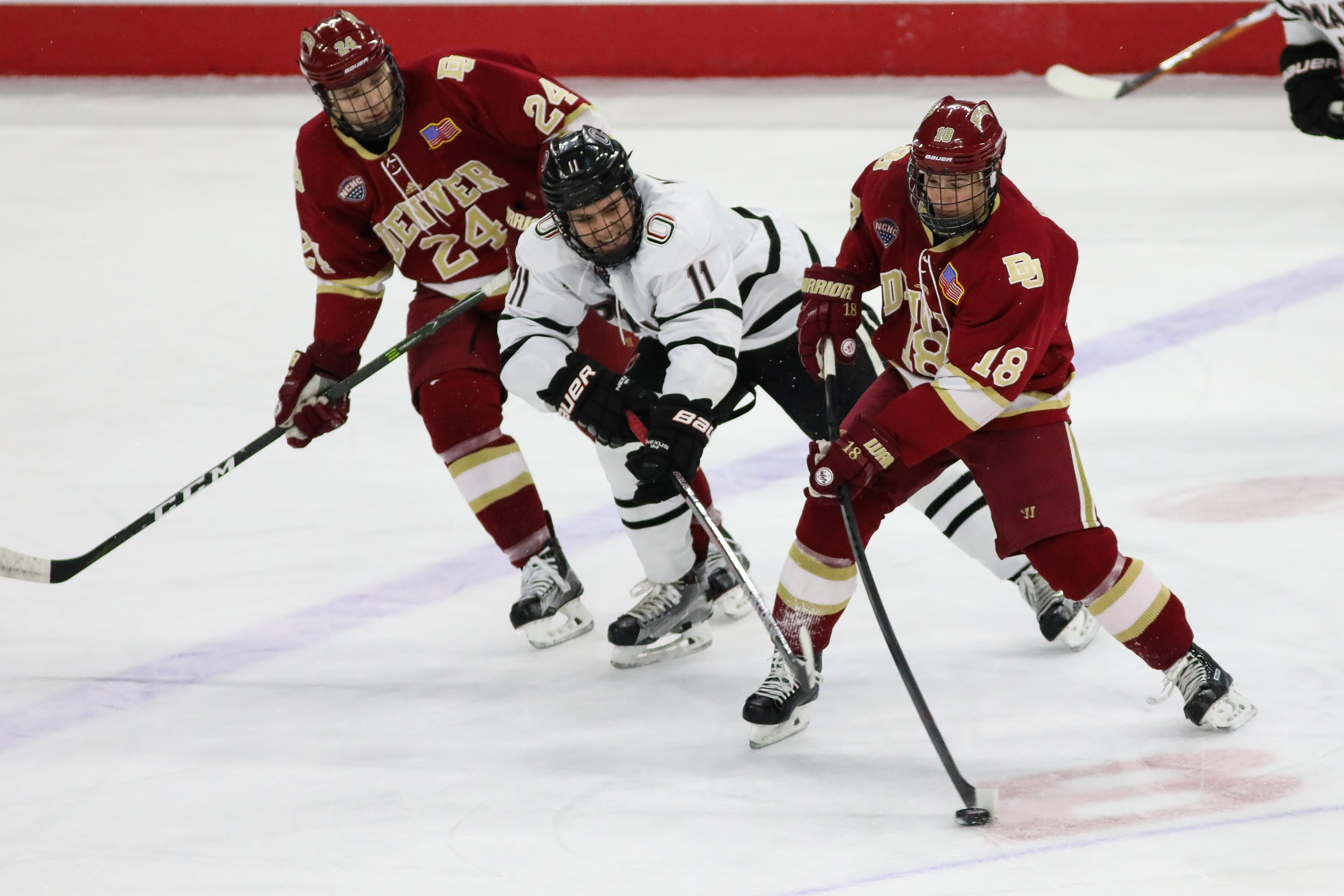
Denver Pioneers men's ice hockey team at Omaha on March 4, 2017

- List of Denver Pioneers in the NFL draft
- List of Denver Pioneers men's basketball head coaches
- List of Denver Pioneers men's ice hockey seasons

===== University of Northern Colorado =====
- List of Northern Colorado Bears head football coaches
- List of Northern Colorado Bears in the NFL draft
- List of Northern Colorado Bears men's basketball head coaches

==== Professional sports ====
- List of professional sports teams of Colorado
- List of former professional sports teams of Colorado

===== Colorado Avalanche =====
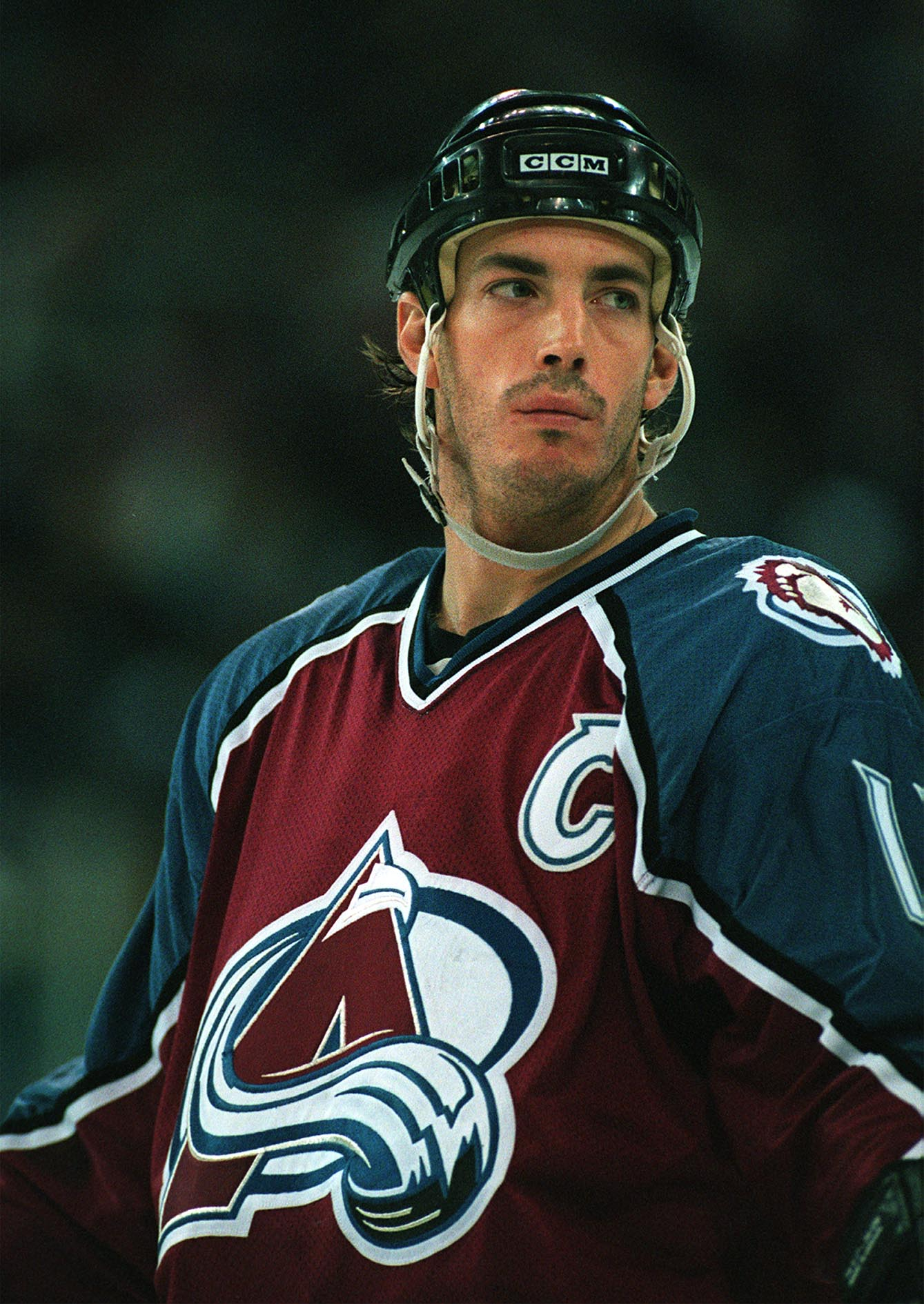
Joe Sakic of the Colorado Avalanche

- List of Colorado Avalanche award winners
- List of Colorado Avalanche broadcasters
- List of Colorado Avalanche draft picks
- List of Colorado Avalanche general managers
- List of Colorado Avalanche head coaches
- List of Colorado Avalanche players
- List of Colorado Avalanche records
- List of Colorado Avalanche seasons

===== Colorado Crush =====
- List of Colorado Crush players
- List of Colorado Crush seasons

===== Colorado Rapids =====
- List of Colorado Rapids seasons

===== Colorado Rockies =====
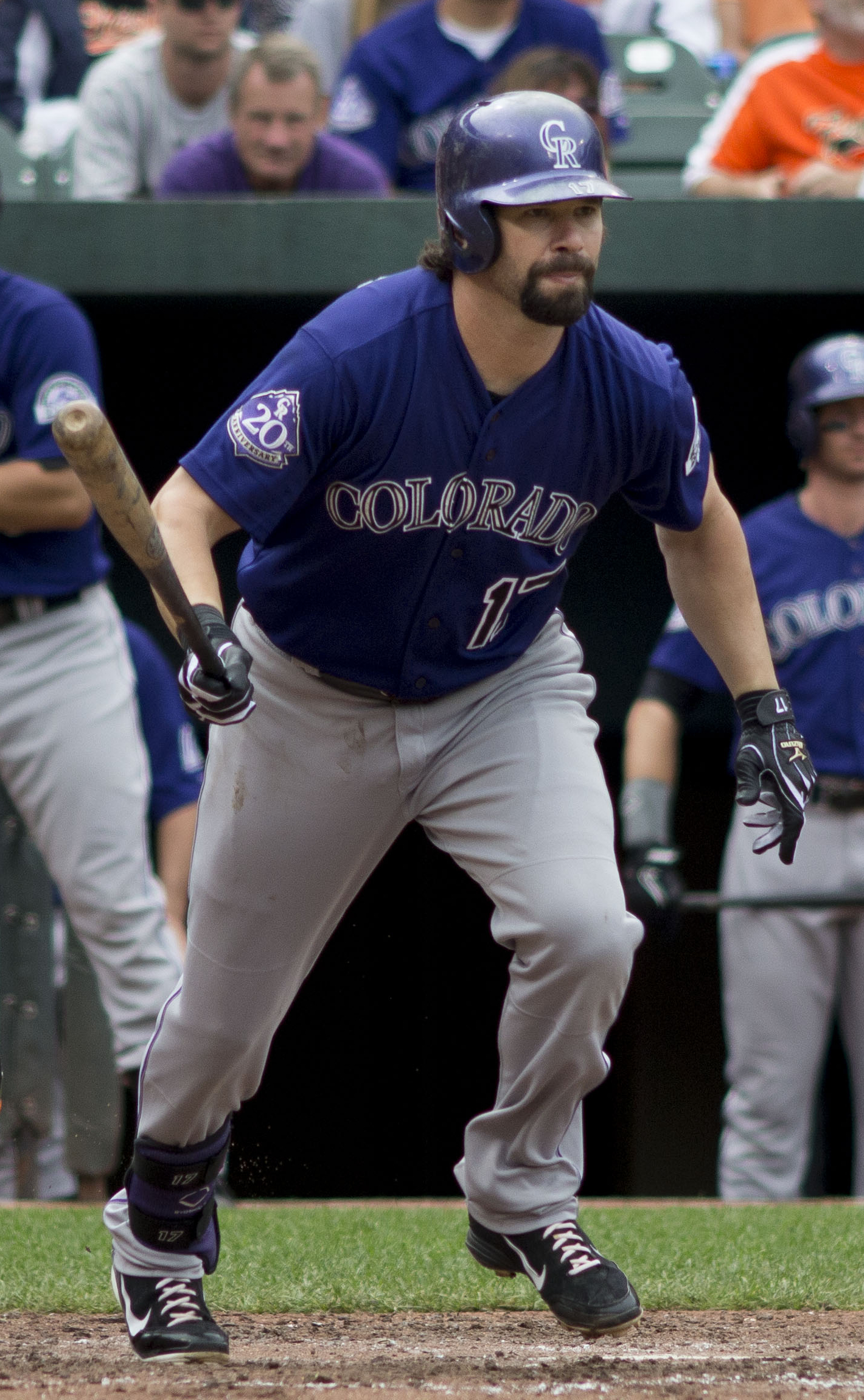
Todd Helton of the Colorado Rockies

- List of Colorado Rockies all-time players
- List of Colorado Rockies broadcasters
- List of Colorado Rockies first-round draft picks
- List of Colorado Rockies head coaches
- List of Colorado Rockies managers
- List of Colorado Rockies minor league affiliates
- List of Colorado Rockies minor league players
- List of Colorado Rockies Opening Day starting pitchers
- List of Colorado Rockies owners and executives
- List of Colorado Rockies seasons
- List of Colorado Rockies team records

===== Colorado Rockies (NHL) =====
- List of Colorado Rockies (NHL) draft picks
- List of Colorado Rockies (NHL) players
- List of Colorado Rockies (NHL) seasons

===== Denver Broncos =====
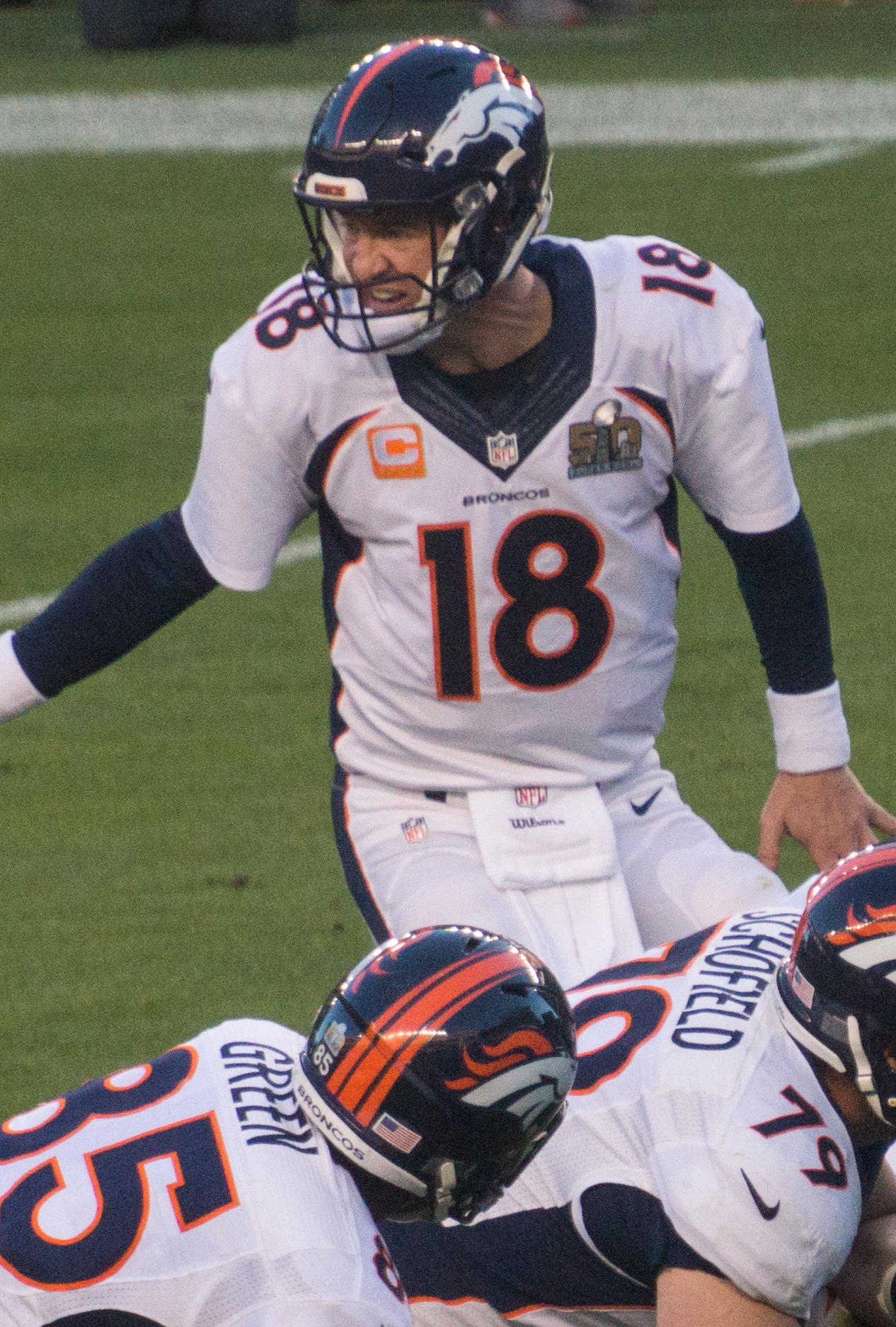
Peyton Manning of the Denver Broncos

- List of Denver Broncos first-round draft picks
- List of Denver Broncos head coaches
- List of Denver Broncos Radio Network stations
- List of Denver Broncos seasons
- List of Denver Broncos starting quarterbacks

===== Denver Dynamite =====
- List of Denver Dynamite seasons

===== Denver Nuggets =====
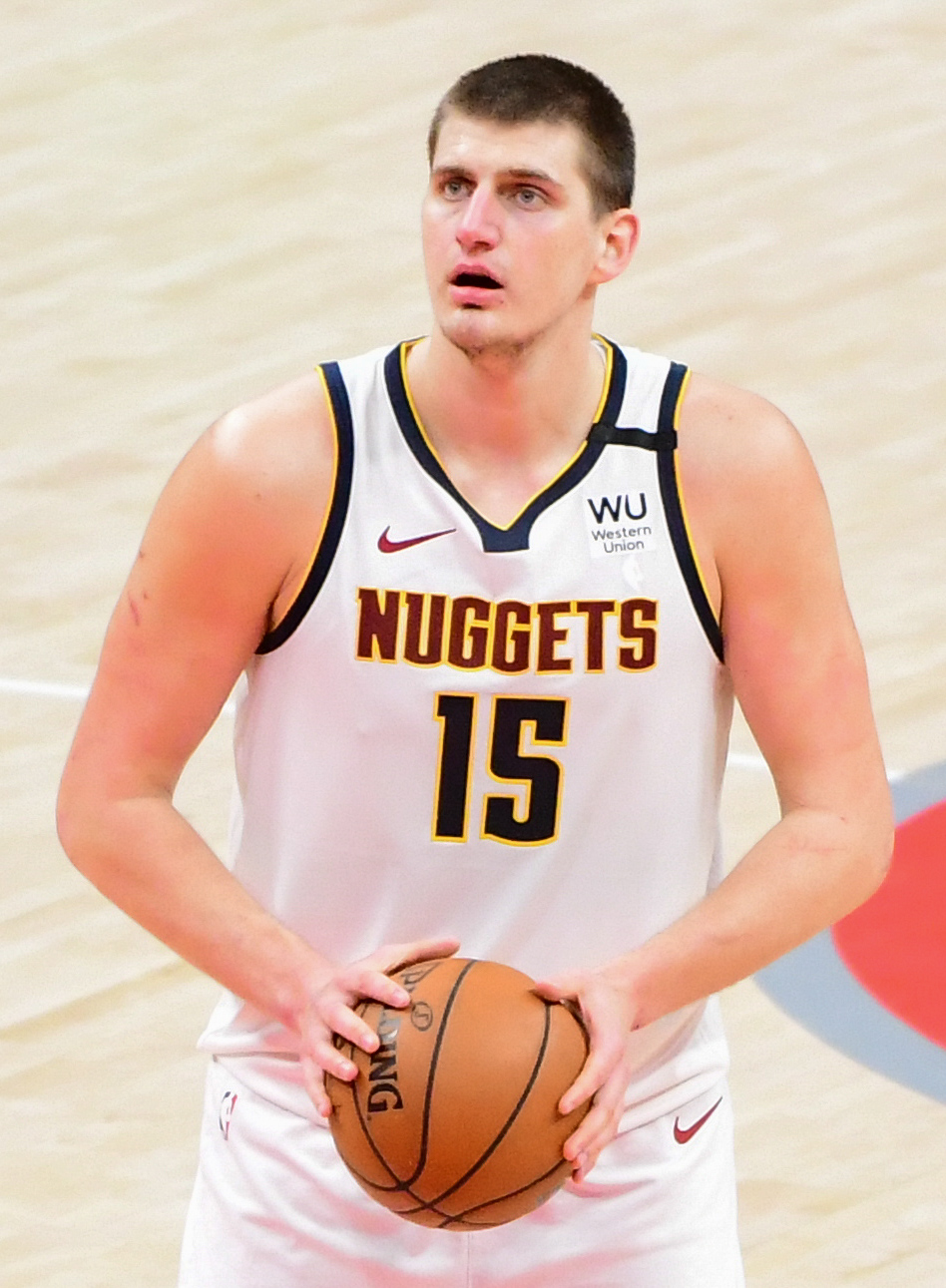
Nikola Jokić of the Denver Nuggets

- List of Denver Nuggets accomplishments and records
- List of Denver Nuggets all-time players
- List of Denver Nuggets draftees
- List of Denver Nuggets head coaches
- List of Denver Nuggets seasons

=== Transportation lists ===
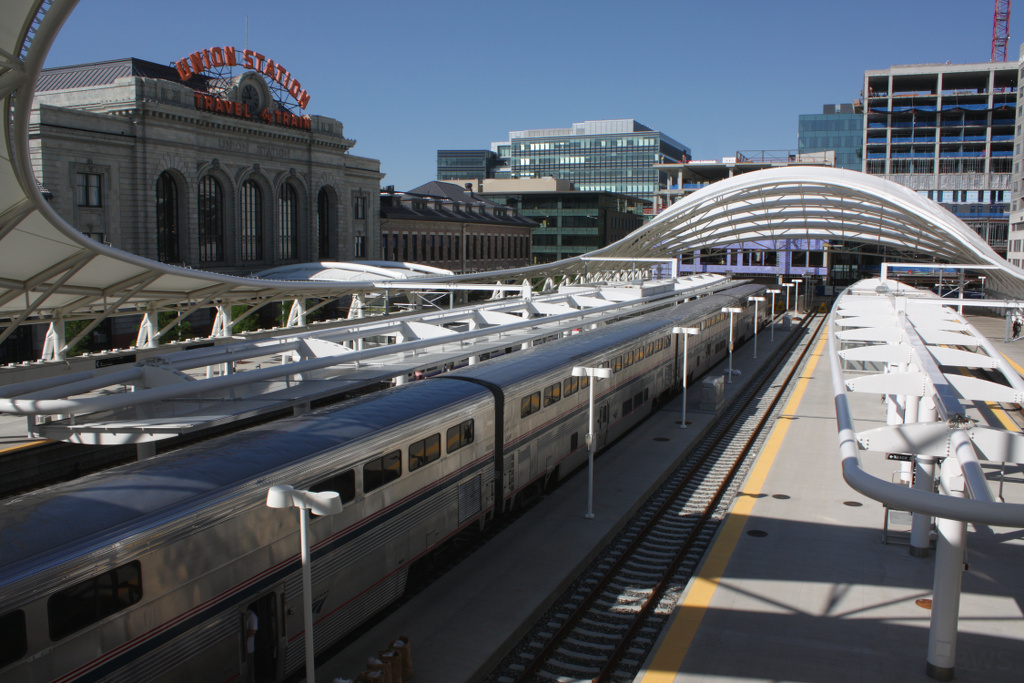
Denver Union Station

- List of airports in Colorado
- List of bicycle routes in Colorado
- List of bridges documented by the Historic American Engineering Record in Colorado
- List of bridges on the National Register of Historic Places in Colorado
- List of Colorado railroads
  - List of Denver RTD rail stations
- List of tunnels documented by the Historic American Engineering Record in Colorado
- List of Colorado vehicle registration plates

==== Lists of highways ====
- List of state highways in Colorado
- List of U.S. Highways in Colorado
- List of Interstate Highways in Colorado
- List of Colorado Scenic and Historic Byways
  - List of Colorado Scenic and Historic Byways with multiple federal designations
  - List of Colorado Scenic and Historic Byways with no federal designations
- List of federal scenic byways in Colorado
  - List of All-American Roads in Colorado
  - List of Back Country Byways in Colorado
  - List of National Forest Scenic Byways in Colorado
  - List of National Scenic Byways in Colorado

== Alphabetical list of Colorado-related lists ==
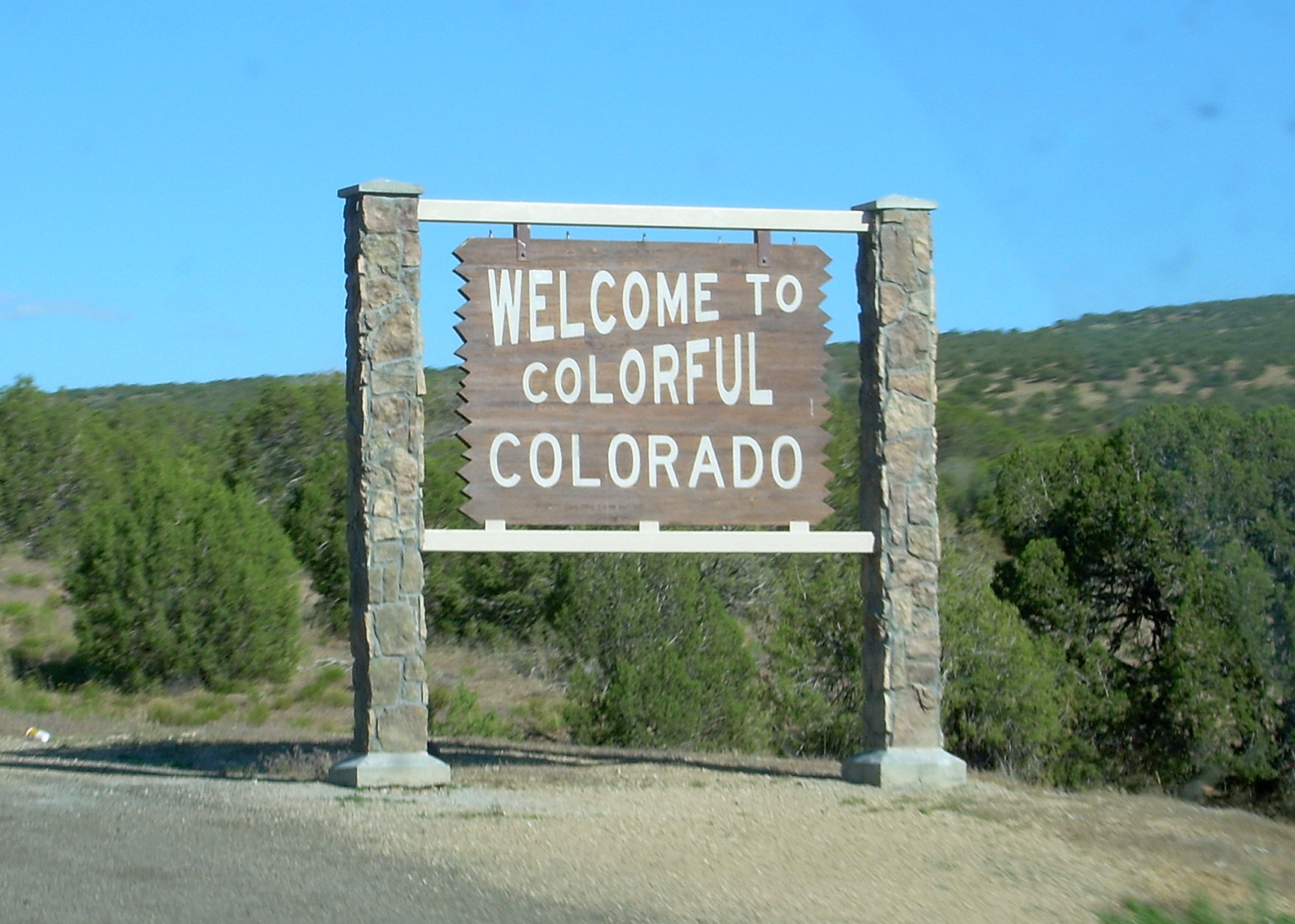
Colorado state welcome sign.

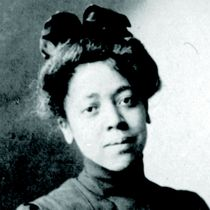
Dr. Justina Ford of Denver

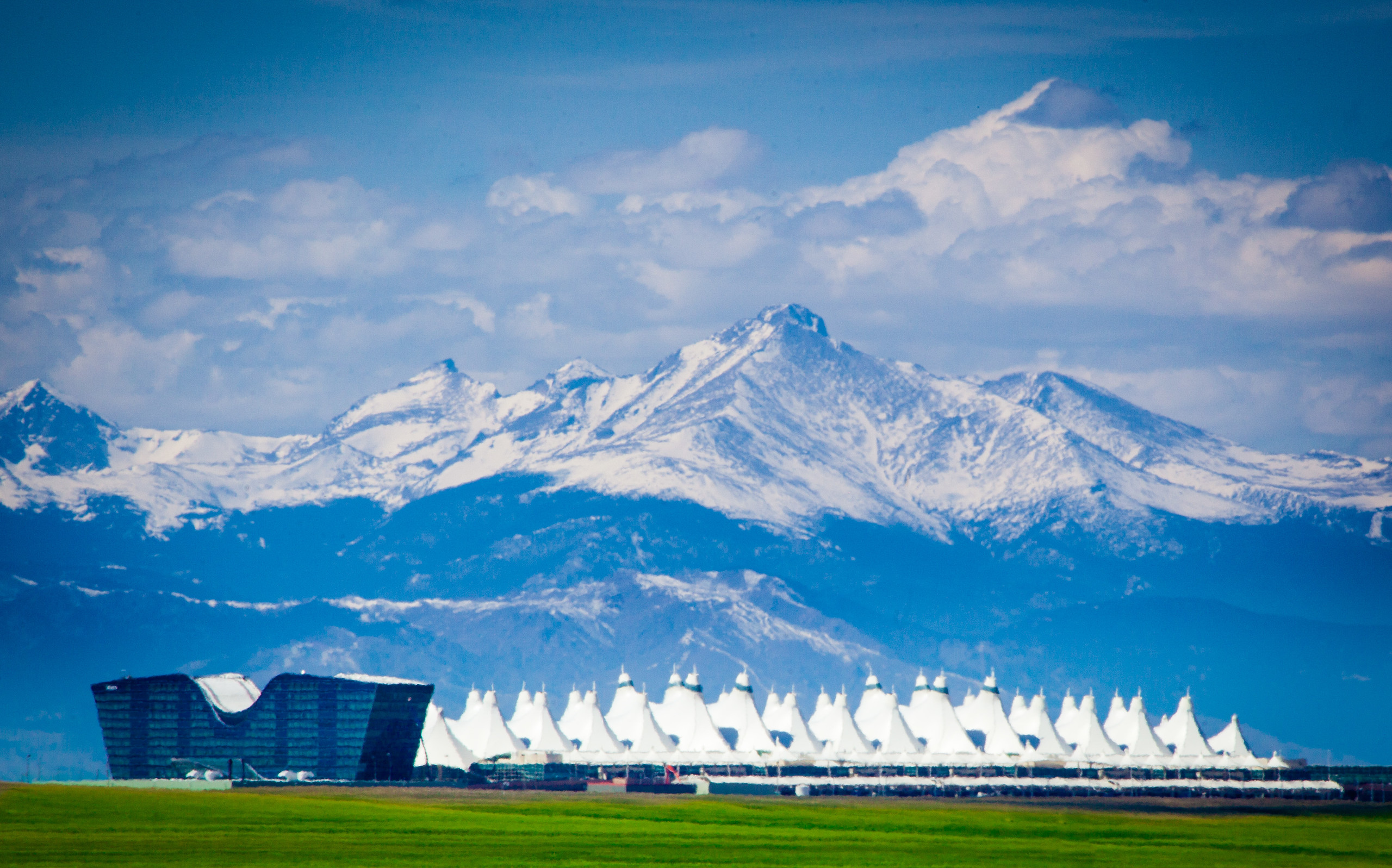
Denver International Airport

- Bibliography of Colorado
- Index of Colorado-related articles
- List of adjectivals and demonyms for Colorado cities
- List of African-American honorees in the Colorado Hall of Fame
- List of African-American newspapers in Colorado
- List of African American pioneers of Colorado
- List of Air Force Falcons bowl games
- List of Air Force Falcons football seasons
- List of Air Force Falcons head football coaches
- List of Air Force Falcons in the NFL draft
- List of Air Force Falcons men's basketball head coaches
- List of Air Force Falcons men's ice hockey seasons
- List of airports in Colorado
- List of All-American Roads in Colorado
- List of amphibians of Colorado
- List of Ancestral Puebloan dwellings in Colorado
- List of area codes in Colorado
- List of Areas of Critical Environmental Concern in Colorado
- List of Art Deco architecture in Colorado
- List of attorneys general of the State of Colorado
- List of attorneys general of the Territory of Colorado
- List of Back Country Byways in Colorado
- List of baseball parks in Denver
- List of battles fought in Colorado
- List of bicycle routes in Colorado
- List of birds of Black Canyon of the Gunnison National Park
- List of birds of Colorado
- List of birds of Rocky Mountain National Park
- List of botanical gardens and arboretums in Colorado

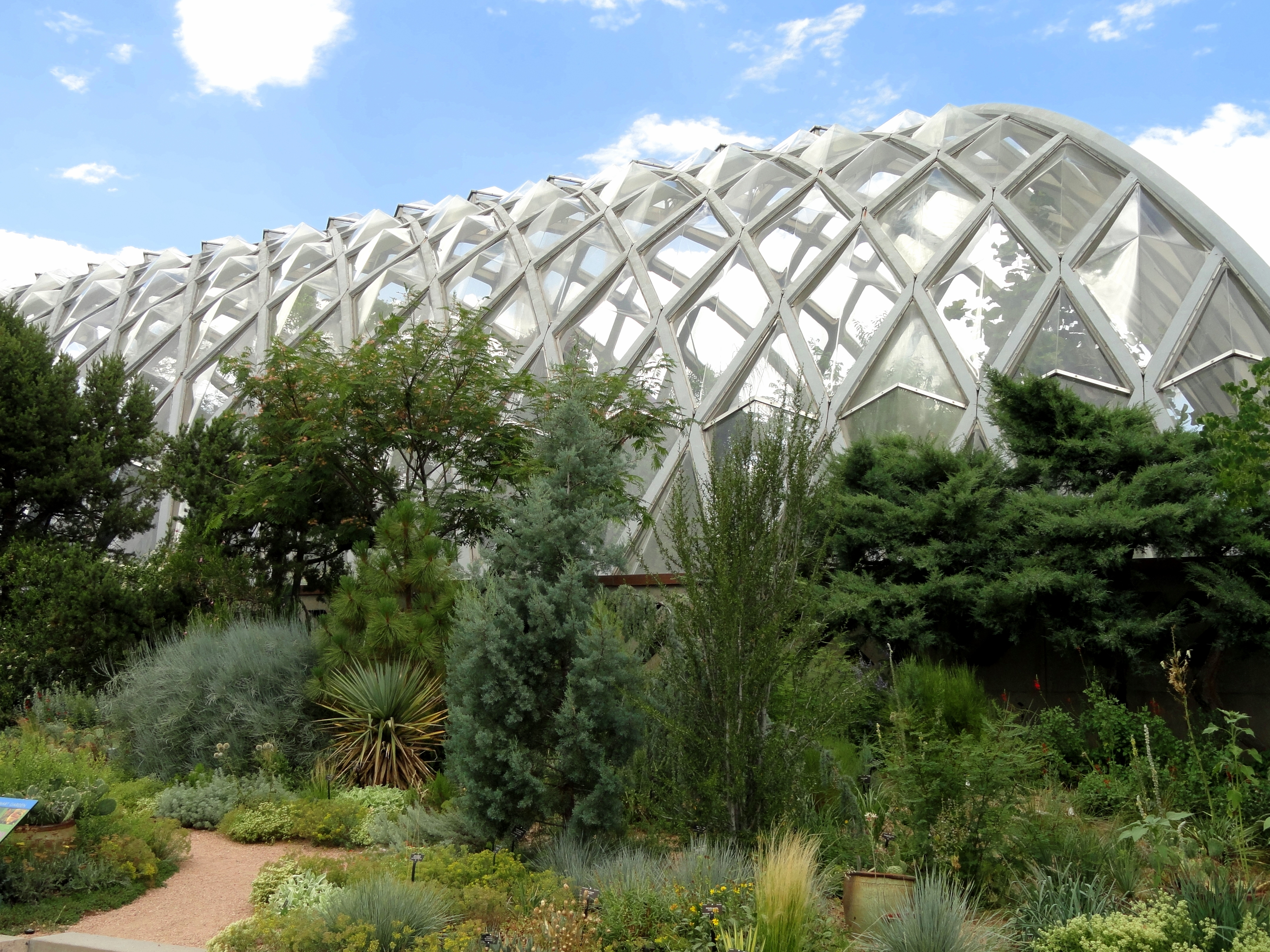
The Denver Botanic Gardens

- List of breweries in Colorado
- List of bridges documented by the Historic American Engineering Record in Colorado
- List of bridges on the National Register of Historic Places in Colorado
- List of Carnegie libraries in Colorado
- List of casinos in Colorado
- List of census-designated places in Colorado

Evergreen Lake in the Evergreen CDP

- List of census-designated places in Colorado by population
- List of census-designated places in more than one Colorado county
- List of charter schools in Colorado
- List of city nicknames in Colorado
- List of college athletic programs in Colorado
- List of colleges and universities in Colorado

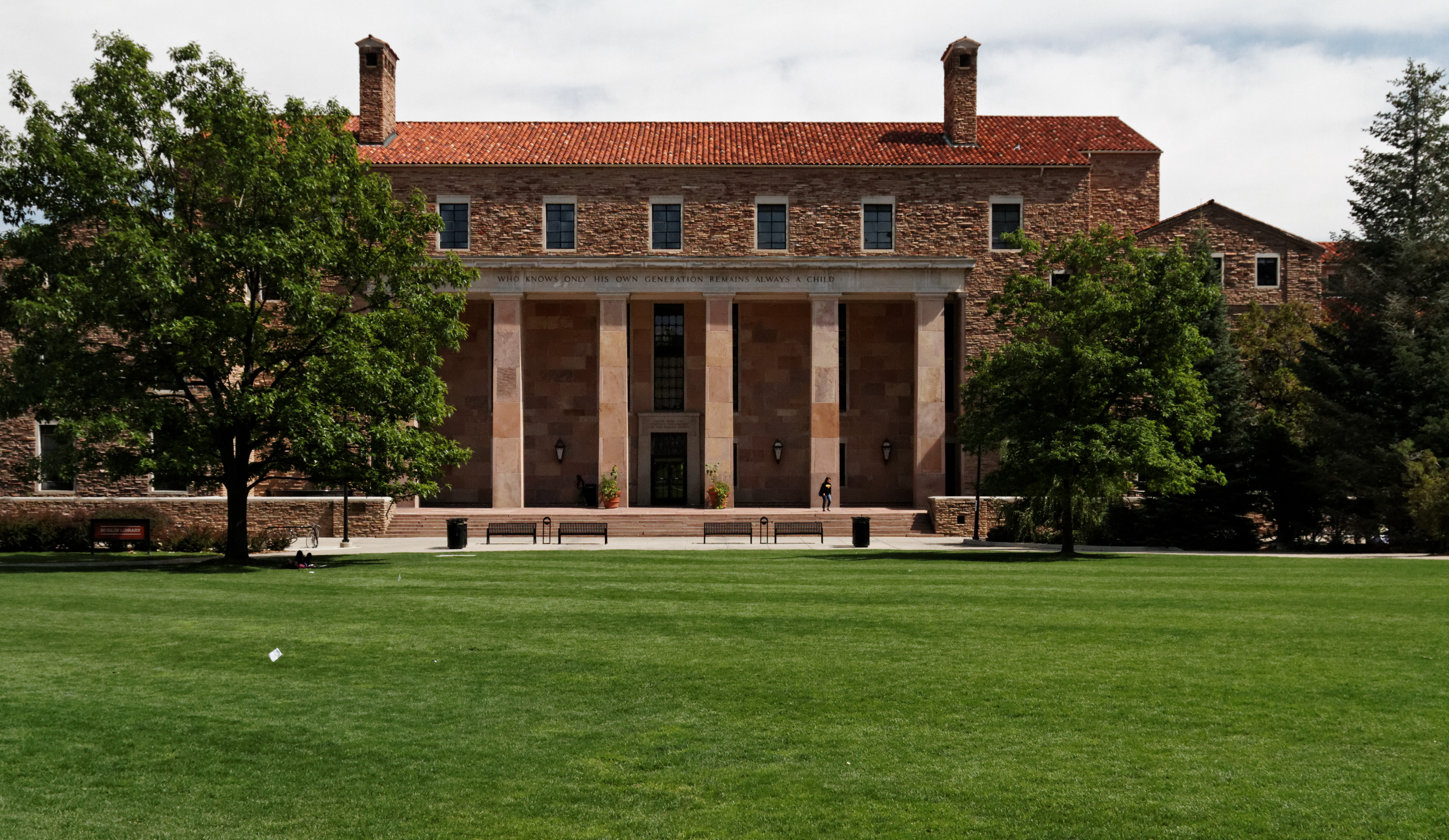
The University of Colorado Boulder

- List of Colorado area codes
- List of Colorado Avalanche award winners
- List of Colorado Avalanche broadcasters
- List of Colorado Avalanche draft picks
- List of Colorado Avalanche general managers
- List of Colorado Avalanche head coaches
- List of Colorado Avalanche players
- List of Colorado Avalanche records
- List of Colorado Avalanche seasons
- List of Colorado ballot measures
- List of Colorado boards of cooperative educational services
- List of Colorado Buffaloes bowl games
- List of Colorado Buffaloes football seasons
- List of Colorado Buffaloes head football coaches
- List of Colorado Buffaloes in the NFL draft
- List of Colorado Buffaloes men's basketball head coaches
- List of Colorado census-designated places
- List of Colorado census-designated places by population
- List of Colorado College people

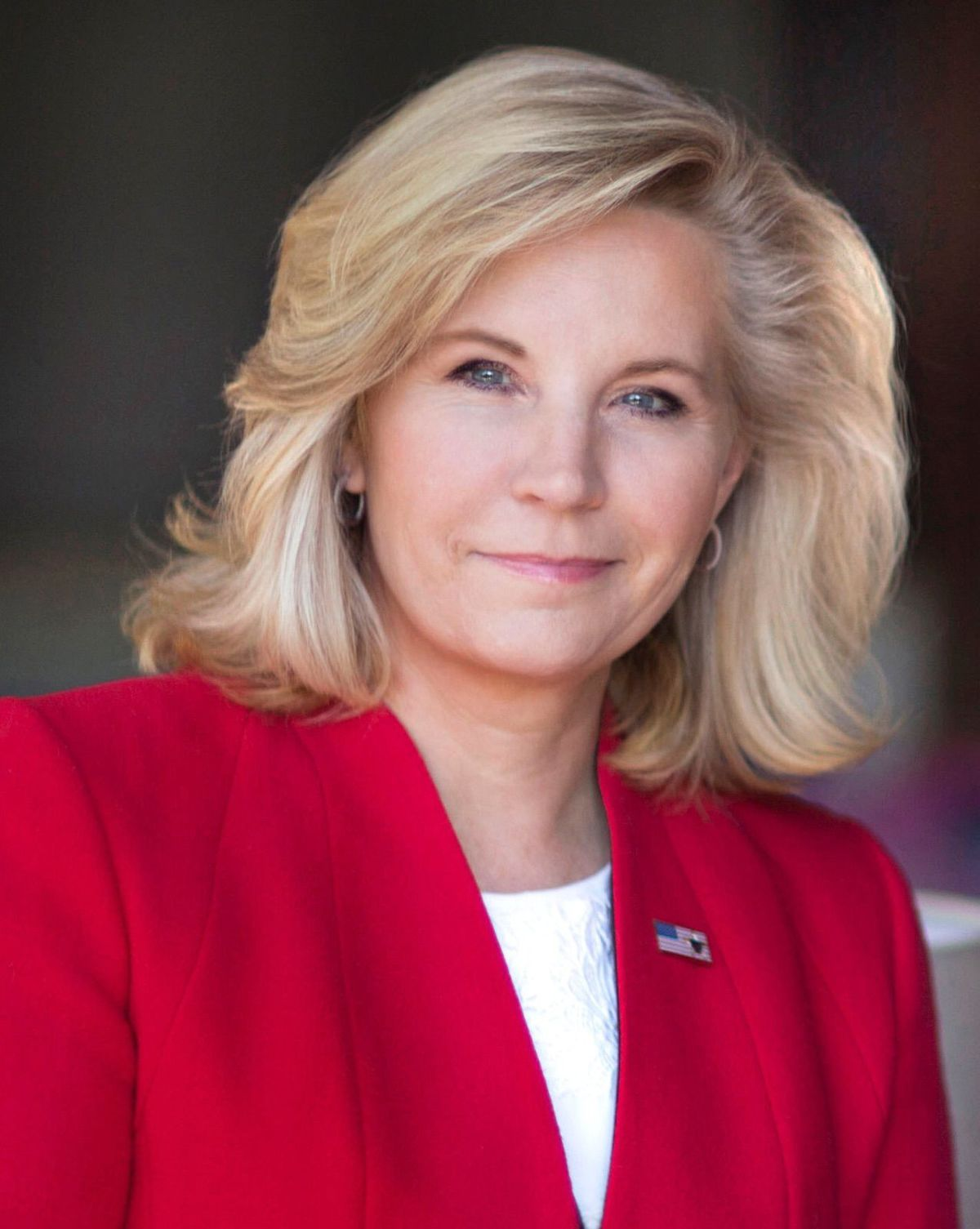
Liz Cheney

- List of Colorado College Tigers men's ice hockey seasons
- List of Colorado companies
- List of Colorado counties
- List of Colorado counties by per capita income
- List of Colorado counties by population
- List of Colorado counties by socioeconomic factors
- List of Colorado counties by statistical area
- List of Colorado county high points
- List of Colorado county seats
- List of Colorado Crush players
- List of Colorado Crush seasons
- List of Colorado drainage basins
- List of Colorado fish hatcheries
- List of Colorado Football Association standings
- List of Colorado fourteeners

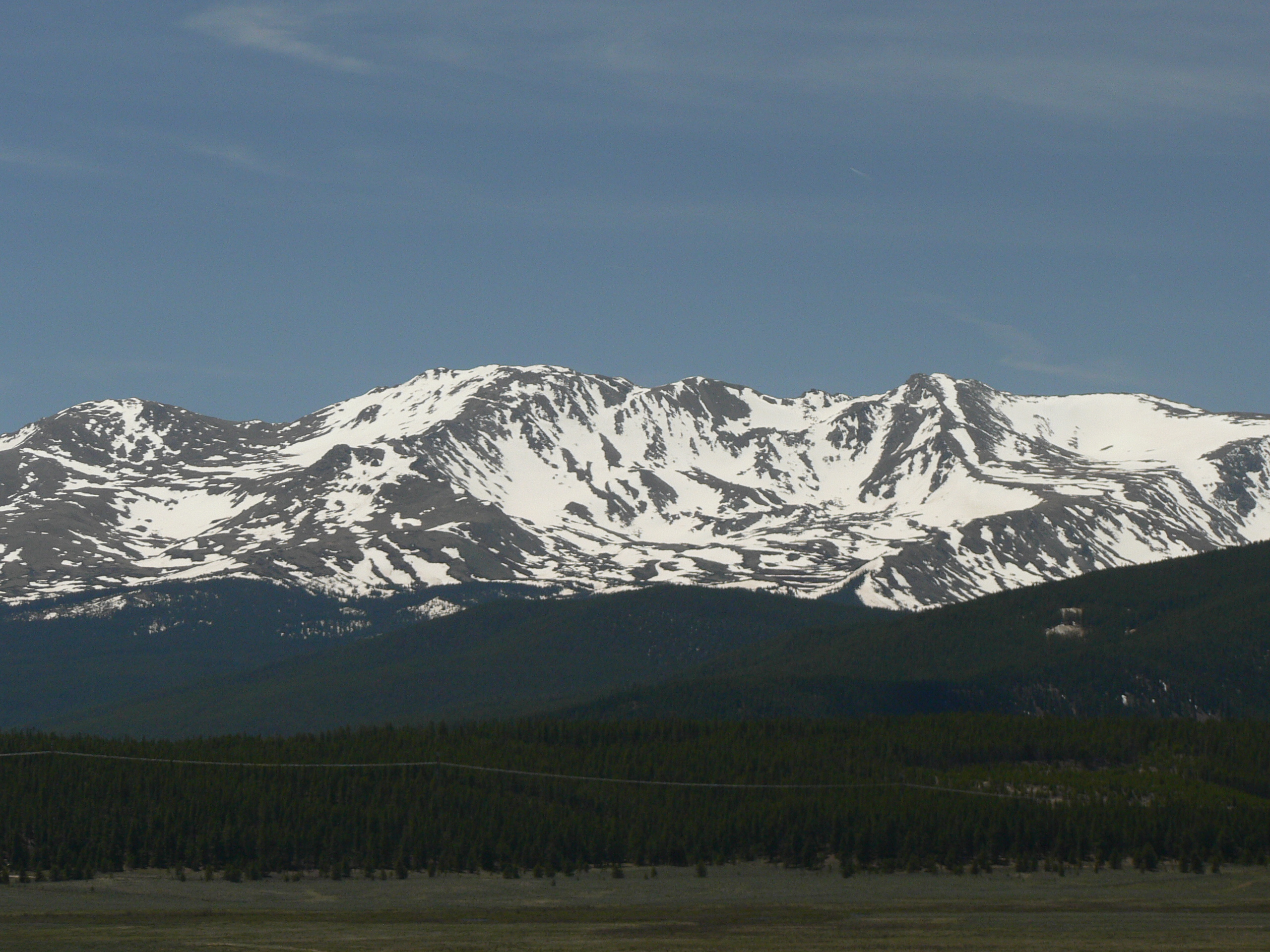
Mount Massive, the second highest summit of the Rocky Mountains

- List of Colorado legislatures
- List of Colorado municipalities
- List of Colorado municipalities by county
- List of Colorado municipalities by elevation
- List of Colorado municipalities by population
- List of Colorado municipalities in multiple counties
- List of Colorado natural areas
- List of Colorado placenames of Native American origin
- List of Colorado populated places
- List of Colorado populated places by county
- List of Colorado-related postage stamps
- List of Colorado railroads

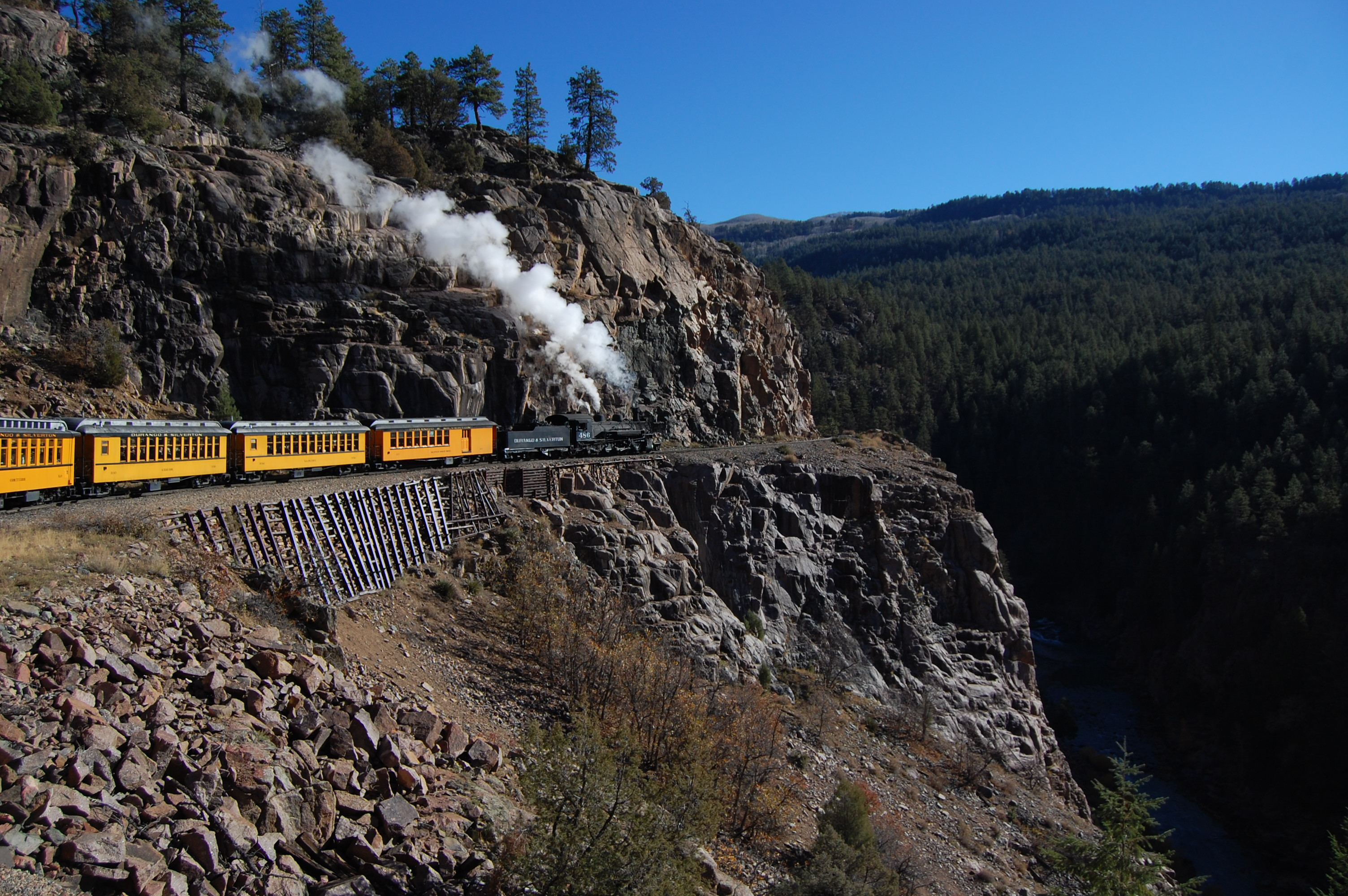
The Durango and Silverton Narrow Gauge Railroad

- List of Colorado Rapids seasons
- List of Colorado Rockies (NHL) draft picks
- List of Colorado Rockies (NHL) players
- List of Colorado Rockies (NHL) seasons
- List of Colorado Rockies all-time players
- List of Colorado Rockies broadcasters
- List of Colorado Rockies first-round draft picks
- List of Colorado Rockies head coaches
- List of Colorado Rockies managers
- List of Colorado Rockies minor league affiliates
- List of Colorado Rockies minor league players
- List of Colorado Rockies Opening Day starting pitchers
- List of Colorado Rockies owners and executives
- List of Colorado Rockies seasons
- List of Colorado Rockies team records
- List of Colorado Scenic and Historic Byways

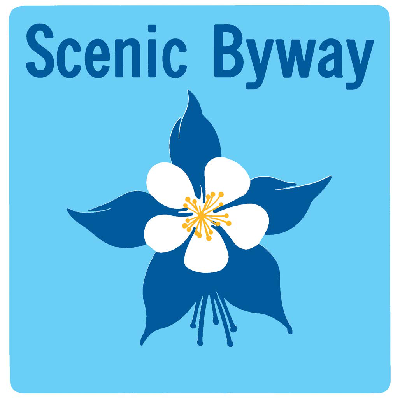
A Colorado Scenic Byway route sign

- List of Colorado Scenic and Historic Byways with multiple federal designations
- List of Colorado Scenic and Historic Byways with no federal designations
- List of Colorado School of Mines people
- List of Colorado ski resorts
- List of Colorado state forests
- List of Colorado state parks

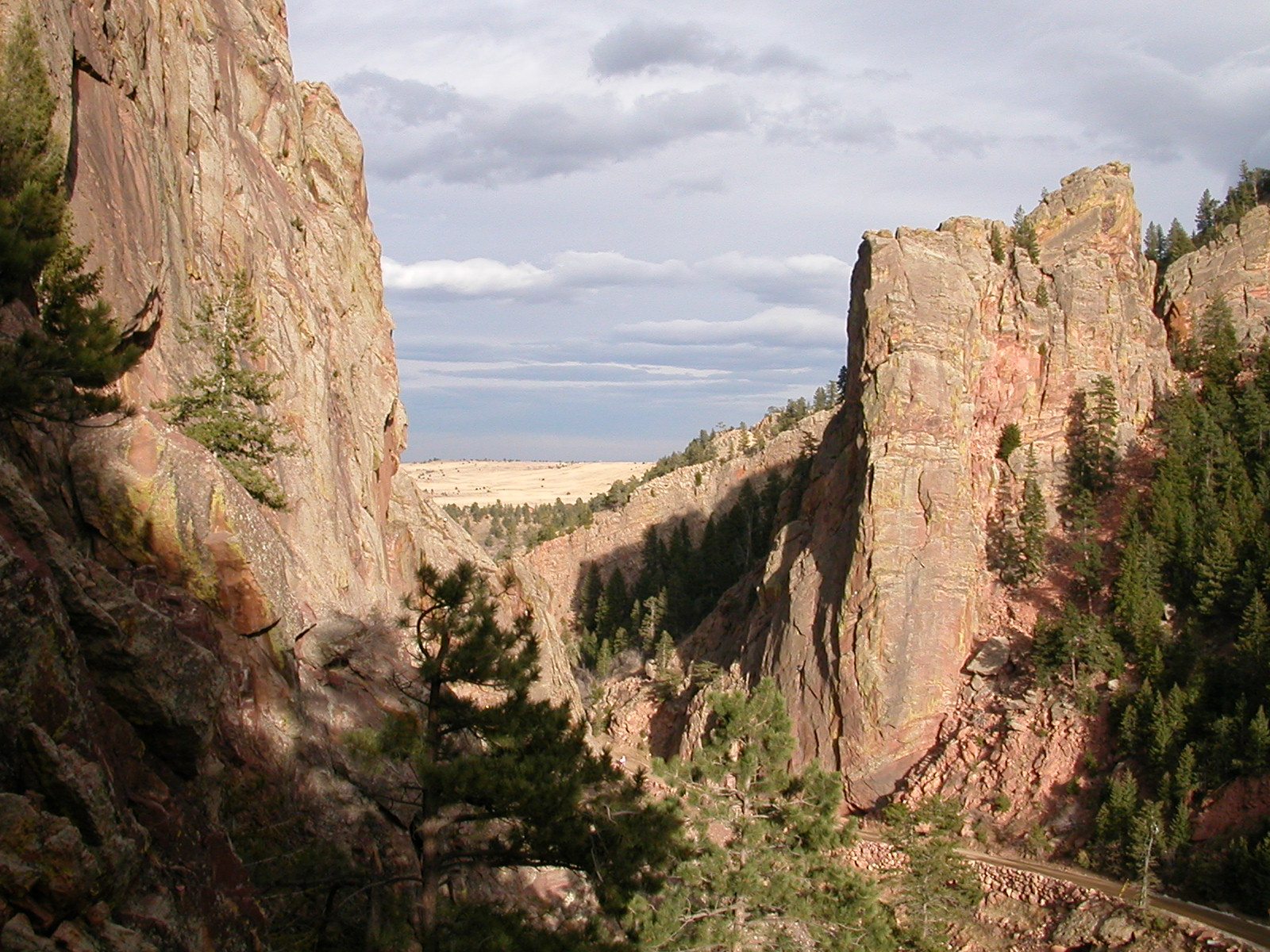
Eldorado Canyon State Park

- List of Colorado state prisons
- List of Colorado State Rams football seasons
- List of Colorado State Rams in the NFL draft
- List of Colorado State Rams men's basketball head coaches
- List of Colorado state representatives
- List of Colorado state senators
- List of Colorado state symbols
- List of Colorado State University people

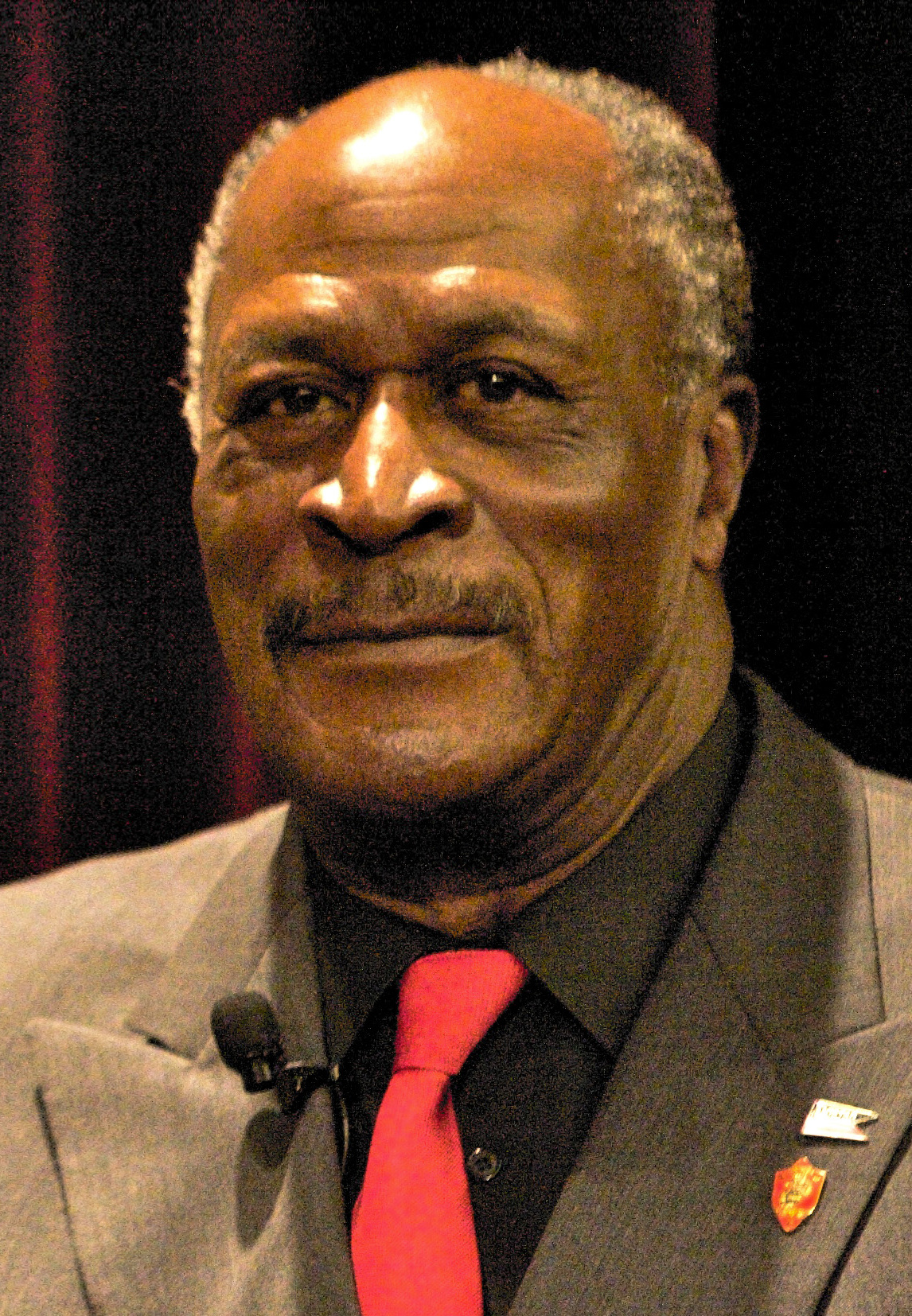
John Amos

- List of Colorado state wildlife areas
- List of Colorado suffragists
- List of Colorado telephone area codes
- List of Colorado Territory Civil War units
- List of Colorado vehicle registration plates
- List of Colorado watersheds
- List of Colorado wildfires
- List of Colorado Women's Hall of Fame honorees

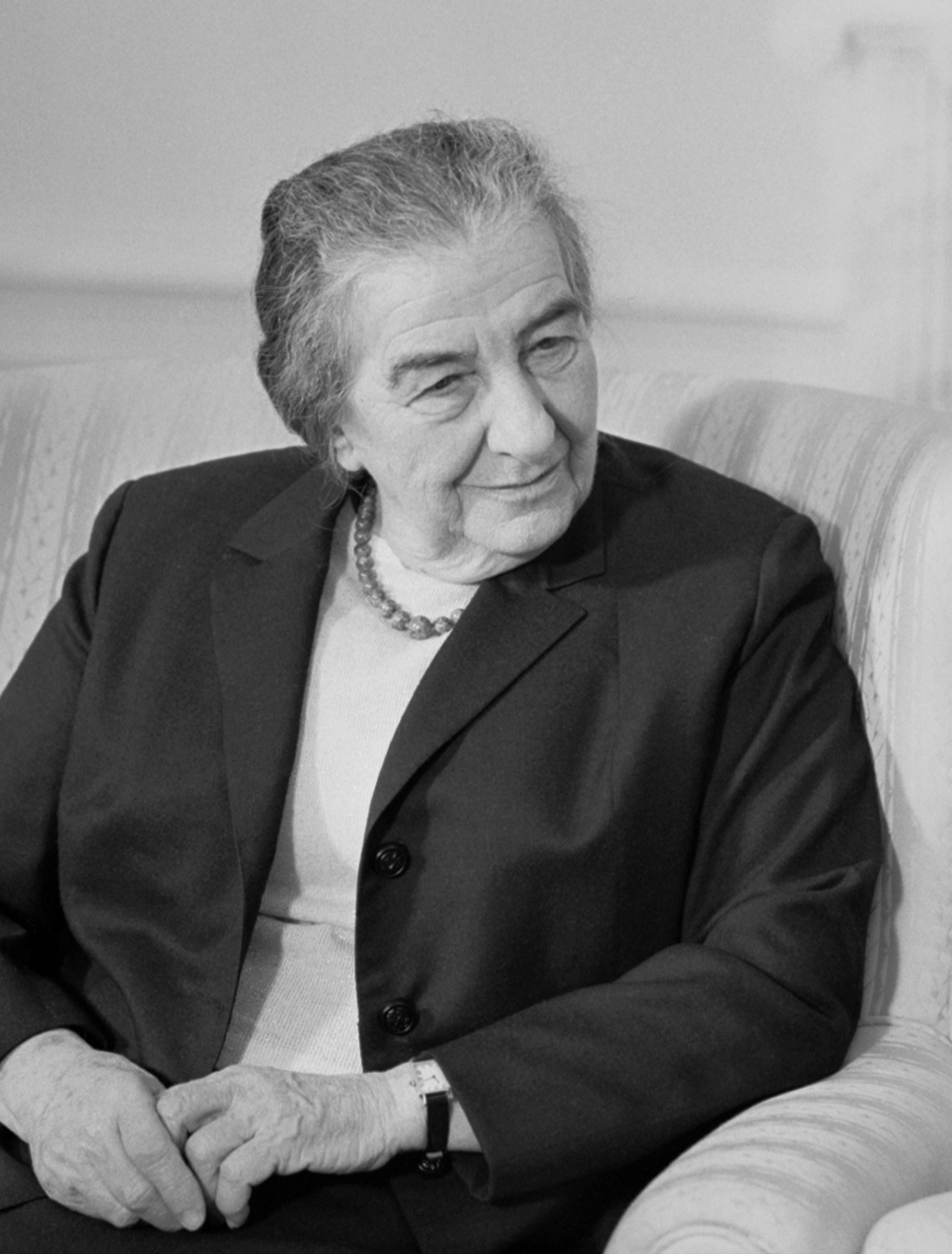
Golda Meir

- List of Colorado ZIP codes
- List of Colorado's congressional delegations
- List of companies with Denver area operations
- List of counties in Colorado
- List of counties in Colorado by population
- List of county courthouses in Colorado
- List of county seats in Colorado
- List of crossings of the Arkansas River
- List of crossings of the Rio Grande
- List of CSU Pueblo ThunderWolves football seasons
- List of dams and reservoirs in Colorado
- List of Denver Broncos first-round draft picks
- List of Denver Broncos head coaches
- List of Denver Broncos Radio Network stations
- List of Denver Broncos seasons
- List of Denver Broncos starting quarterbacks
- List of Denver Dynamite seasons
- List of Denver landmarks

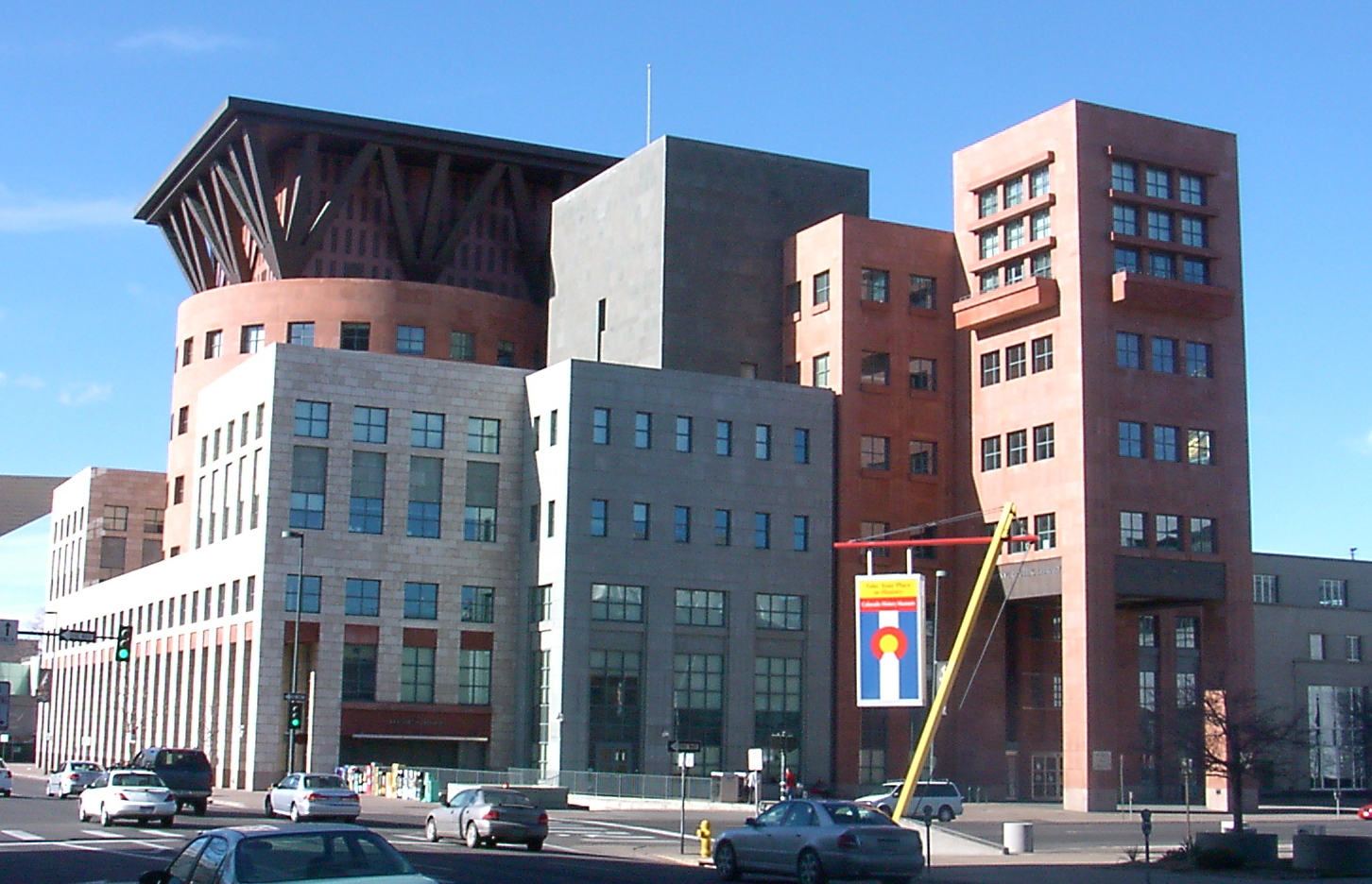
The Denver Public Library

- List of Denver music venues
- List of Denver neighborhoods
- List of Denver Nuggets accomplishments and records
- List of Denver Nuggets all-time players
- List of Denver Nuggets draftees
- List of Denver Nuggets head coaches
- List of Denver Nuggets seasons
- List of Denver Pioneers in the NFL draft
- List of Denver Pioneers men's basketball head coaches
- List of Denver Pioneers men's ice hockey seasons
- List of Denver RTD rail stations
- List of drainage basins in Colorado
- List of elected state officers of Colorado
- List of environmental education centers in Colorado
- List of extreme summits of the Rocky Mountains

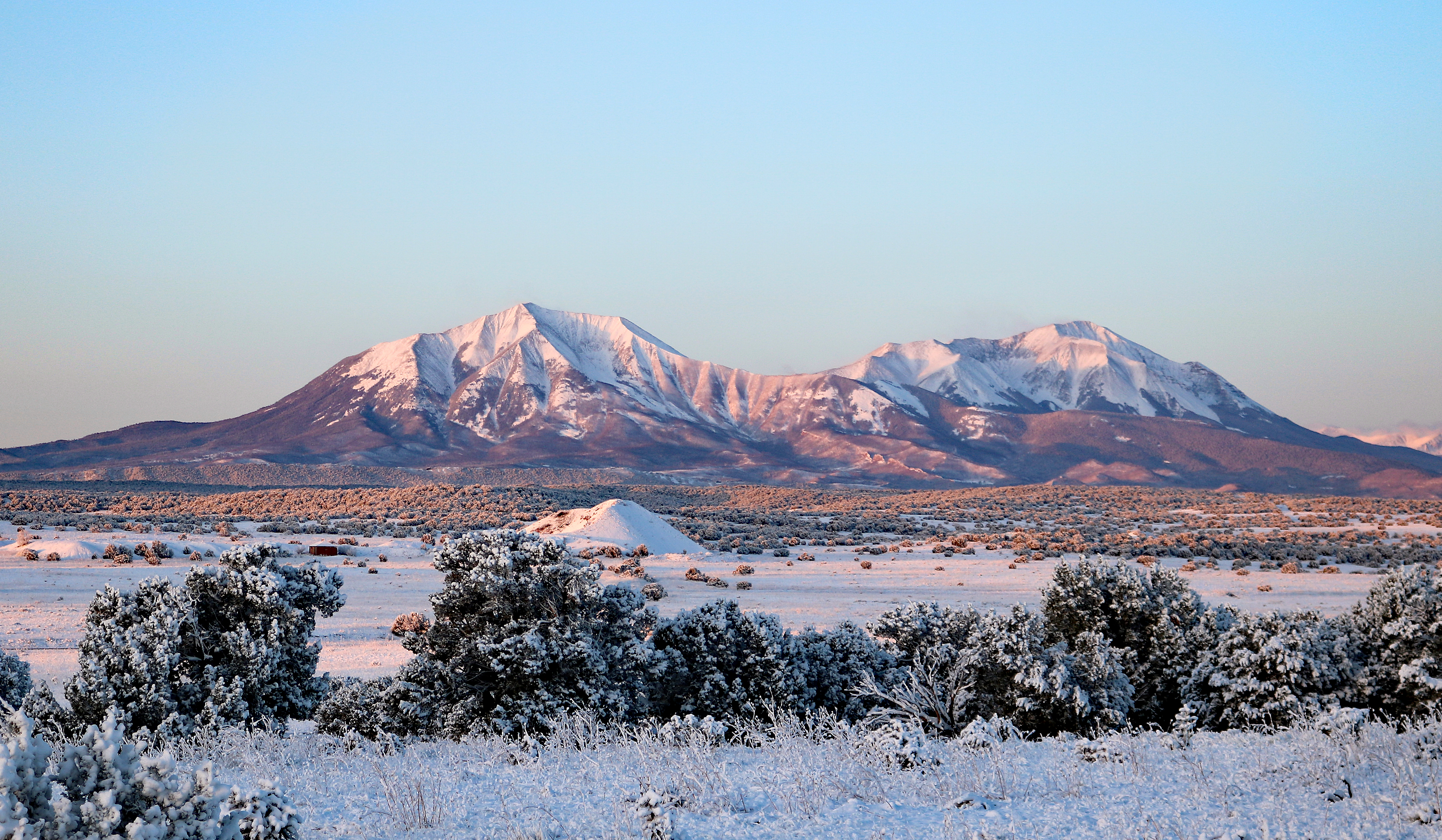
Spanish Peaks as seen from the Santa Fe National Historic Trail

- List of federal lands in Colorado
- List of federal scenic byways in Colorado
- List of first minority male lawyers and judges in Colorado
- List of first women lawyers and judges in Colorado
- List of fishes of Boulder Creek, Colorado
- List of fishes of Colorado
- List of former municipalities in Colorado
- List of former professional sports teams of Colorado
- List of forts in Colorado
- List of fossiliferous stratigraphic units in Colorado
- List of general assemblies of the State of Colorado
- List of ghost towns in Colorado

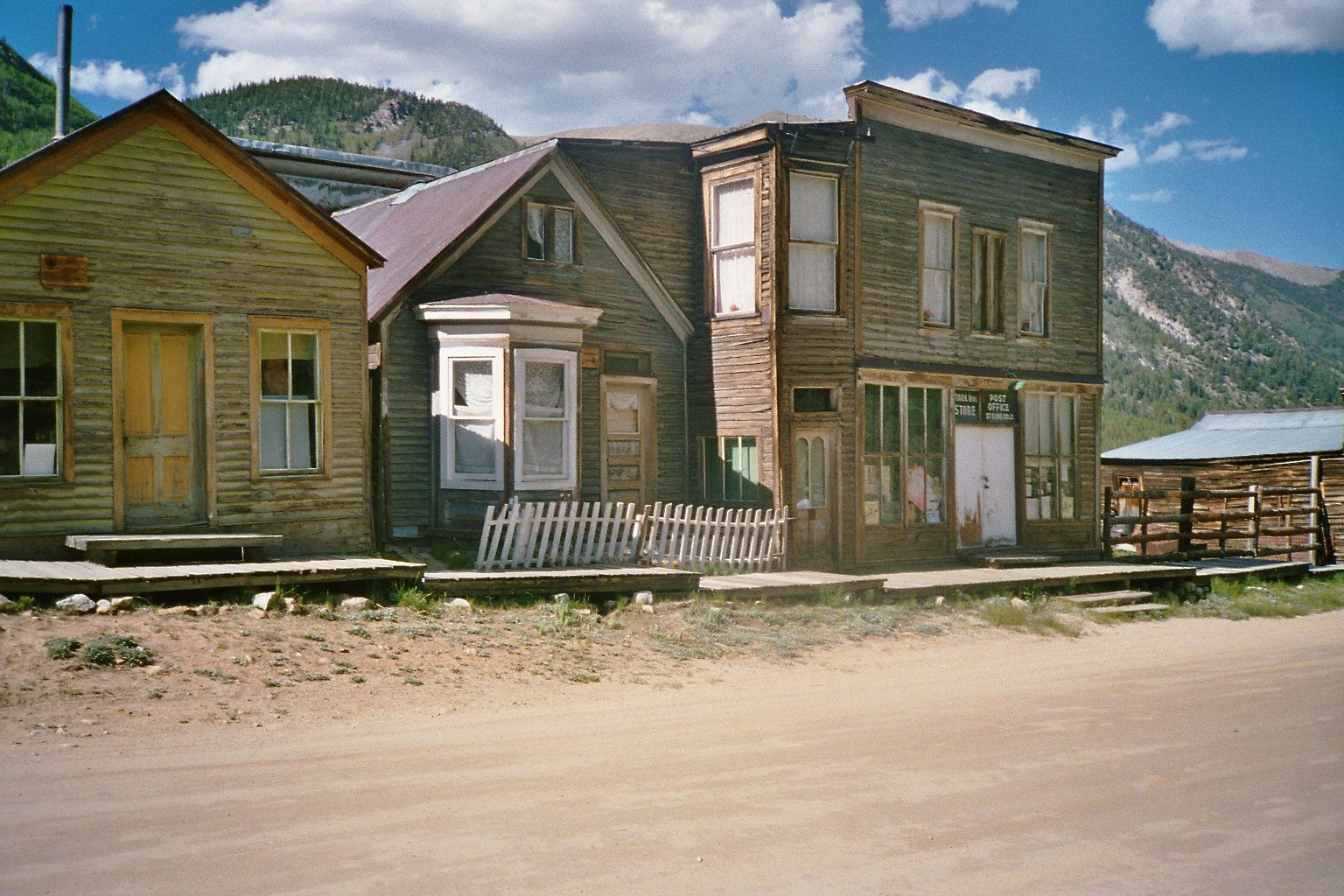
The ghost town of St. Elmo, Colorado

- List of governors of Colorado
- List of governors of the State of Colorado
- List of governors of the Territory of Colorado
- List of governors of the Territory of Jefferson
- List of Great American Beer Festival medalists
- List of high schools in Colorado
- List of hospitals in Colorado
- List of hot springs in Colorado
- List of Indian reservations in Colorado
- List of Interstate Highways in Colorado

A Colorado Interstate Highway route marker

- List of justices of the Colorado Supreme Court
- List of lakes of Colorado
- List of largest reservoirs in Colorado
- List of law enforcement agencies in Colorado
- List of legislative assemblies of the Territory of Colorado
- List of lieutenant governors of the State of Colorado
- List of mammals of Colorado
- List of Manitou Springs Historic District buildings
- List of mayors of Denver
- List of military installations in Colorado
- List of mountain passes in Colorado

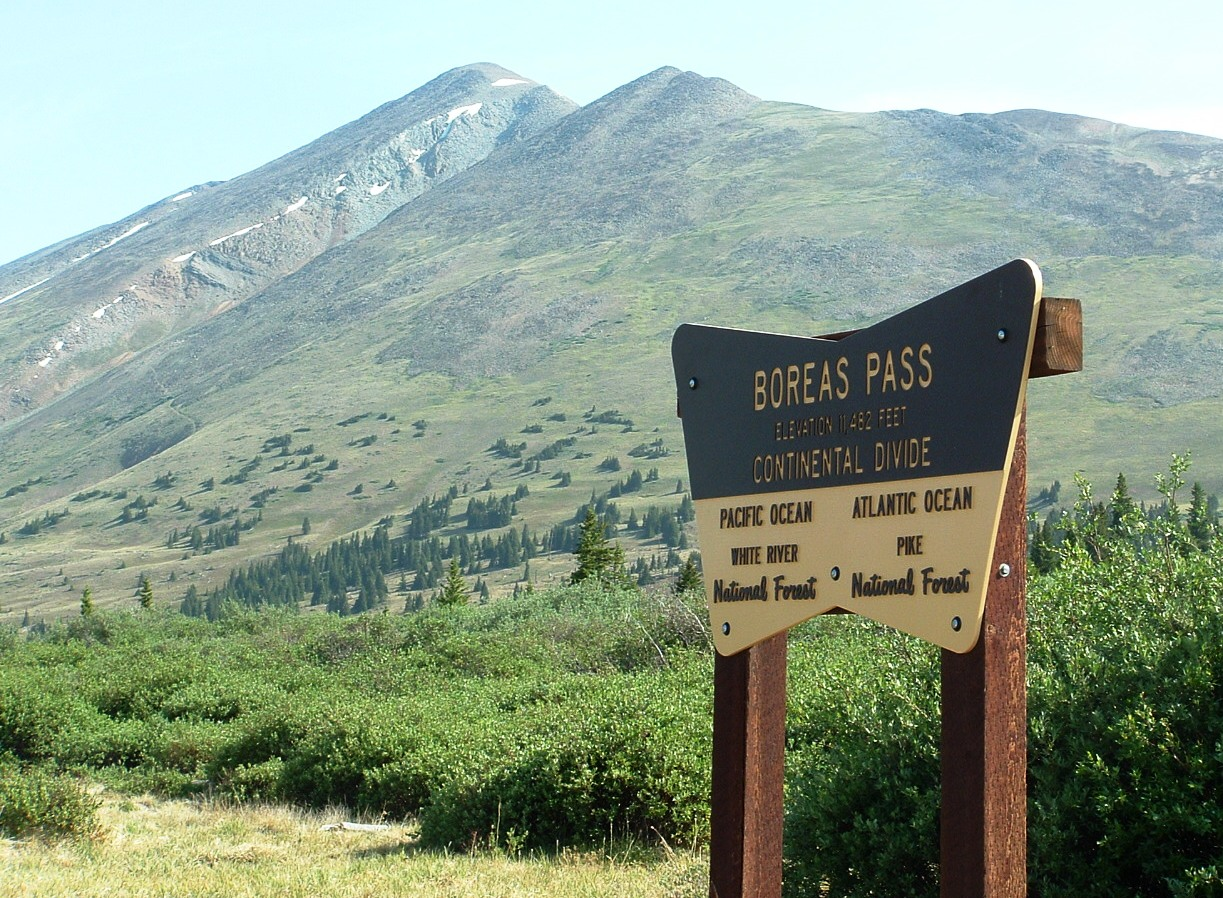
Boreas Pass on the Continental Divide

- List of mountain peaks of Colorado
- List of mountain peaks of the Rocky Mountains
- List of mountain peaks of the Southern Rocky Mountains
- List of mountain peaks of the United States
- List of mountain ranges of Colorado
- List of mountain ranges of the Southern Rocky Mountains
- List of mountains in Colorado
- List of Mr. Colorado Basketball honorees
- List of municipalities in Colorado
- List of municipalities in Colorado by elevation
- List of municipalities in Colorado by population
- List of municipalities in more than one Colorado county
- List of museums in Colorado

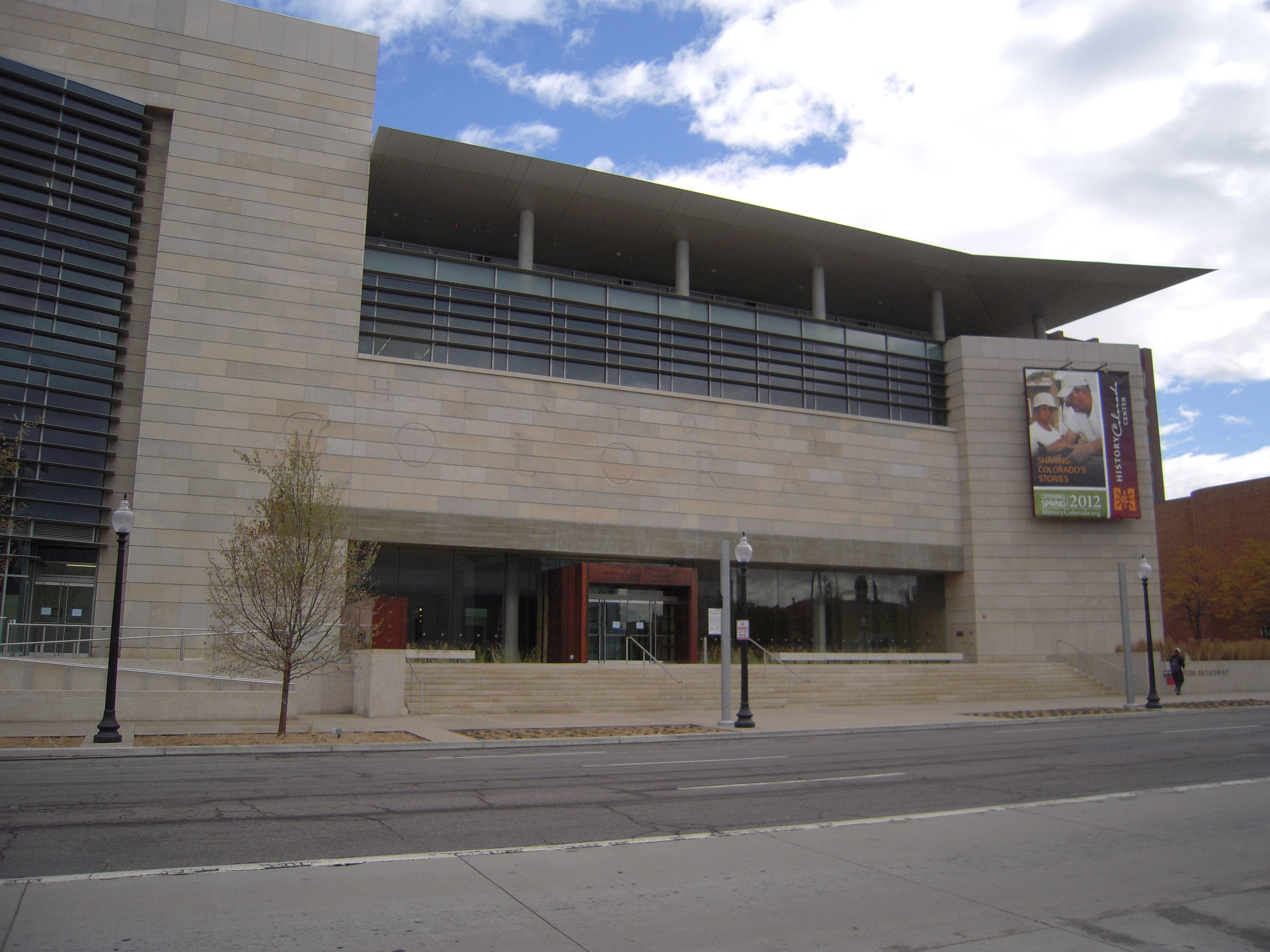
The History Colorado Center

- List of music venues around Denver
- List of national conservation areas in Colorado
- List of national conservation lands in Colorado
- List of National Forest Scenic Byways in Colorado
- List of national forests in Colorado
- List of national grasslands in Colorado
- List of national heritage areas in Colorado
- List of National Historic Landmarks in Colorado
- List of national historic sites in Colorado
- List of national historic trails in Colorado
- List of national monuments in Colorado

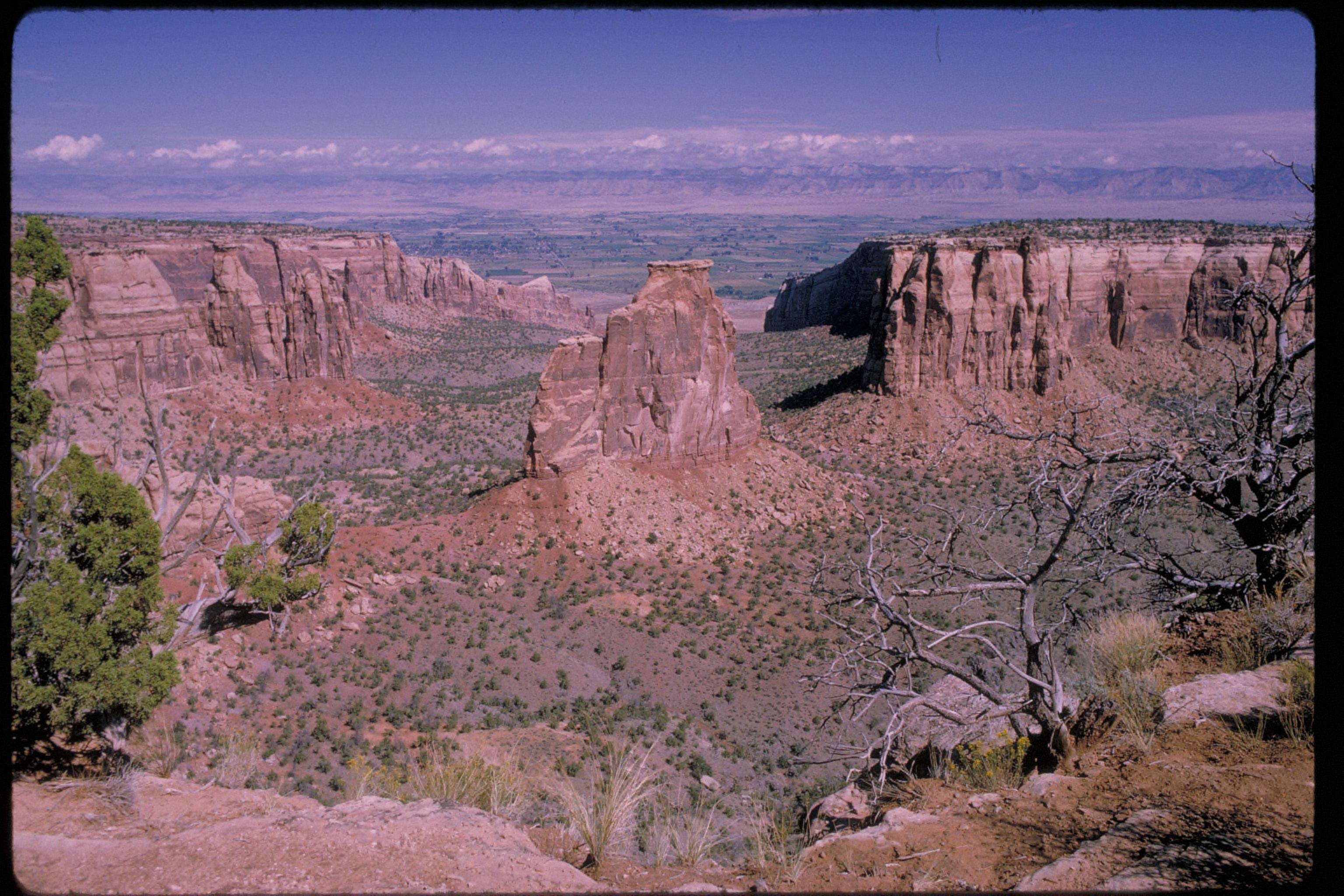
Colorado National Monument

- List of national natural landmarks in Colorado
- List of national parks in Colorado
- List of national recreation areas in Colorado
- List of National Recreation Trails in Colorado
- List of National Register of Historic Places in Adams County, Colorado
- List of National Register of Historic Places in Alamosa County, Colorado
- List of National Register of Historic Places in Arapahoe County, Colorado
- List of National Register of Historic Places in Archuleta County, Colorado

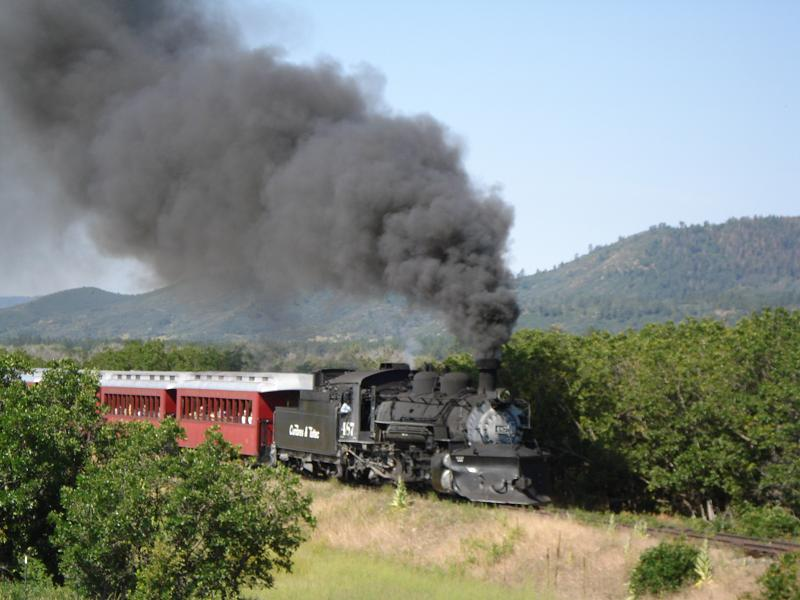
The Cumbres and Toltec Scenic Railroad

- List of National Register of Historic Places in Baca County, Colorado
- List of National Register of Historic Places in Bent County, Colorado
- List of National Register of Historic Places in Boulder County, Colorado

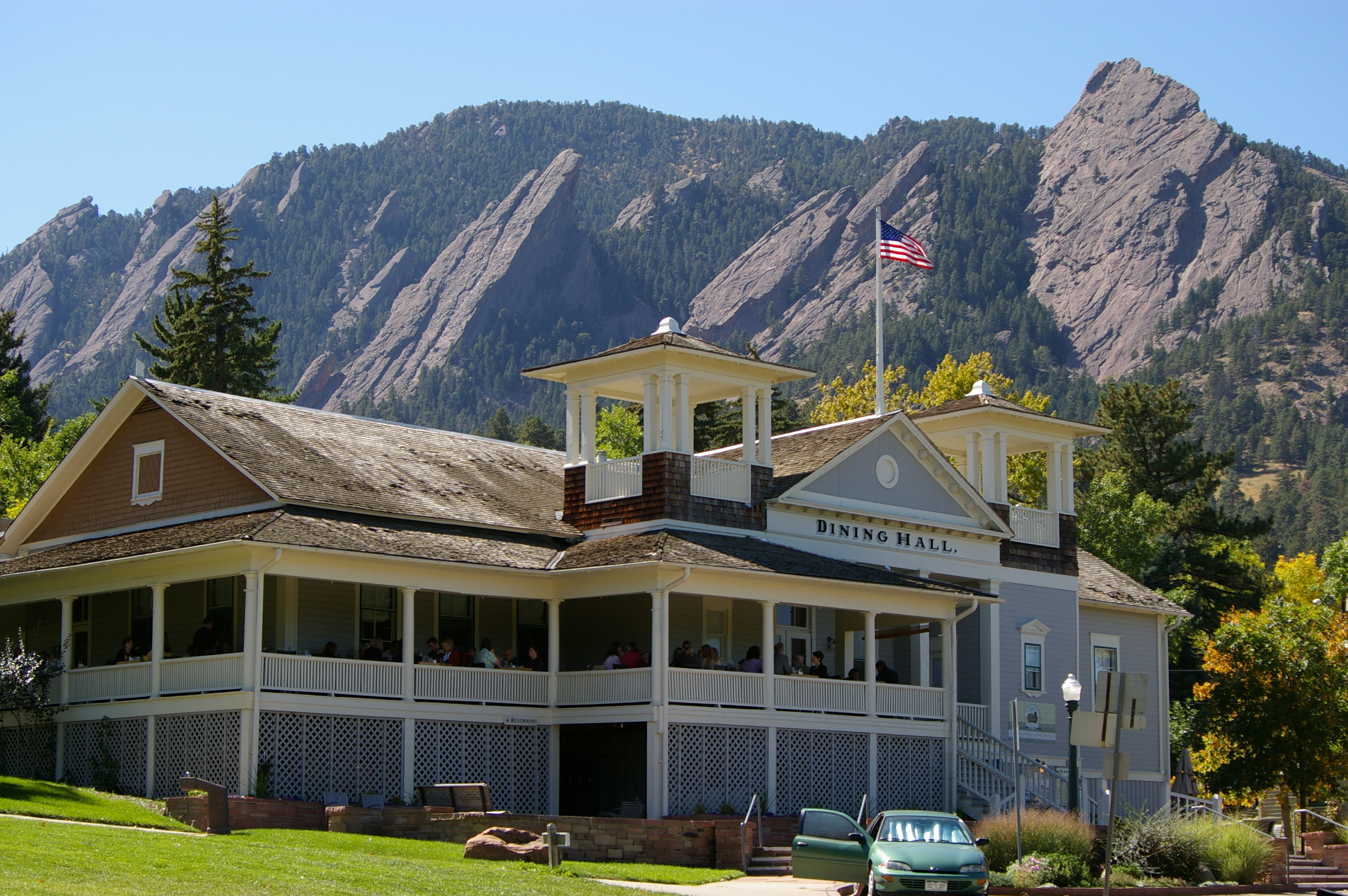
The Colorado Chautauqua

- List of National Register of Historic Places in Broomfield, Colorado
- List of National Register of Historic Places in Chaffee County, Colorado
- List of National Register of Historic Places in Cheyenne County, Colorado
- List of National Register of Historic Places in Clear Creek County, Colorado
- List of National Register of Historic Places in Colorado
- List of National Register of Historic Places in Conejos County, Colorado
- List of National Register of Historic Places in Costilla County, Colorado
- List of National Register of Historic Places in Crowley County, Colorado
- List of National Register of Historic Places in Custer County, Colorado
- List of National Register of Historic Places in Delta County, Colorado
- List of National Register of Historic Places in Denver

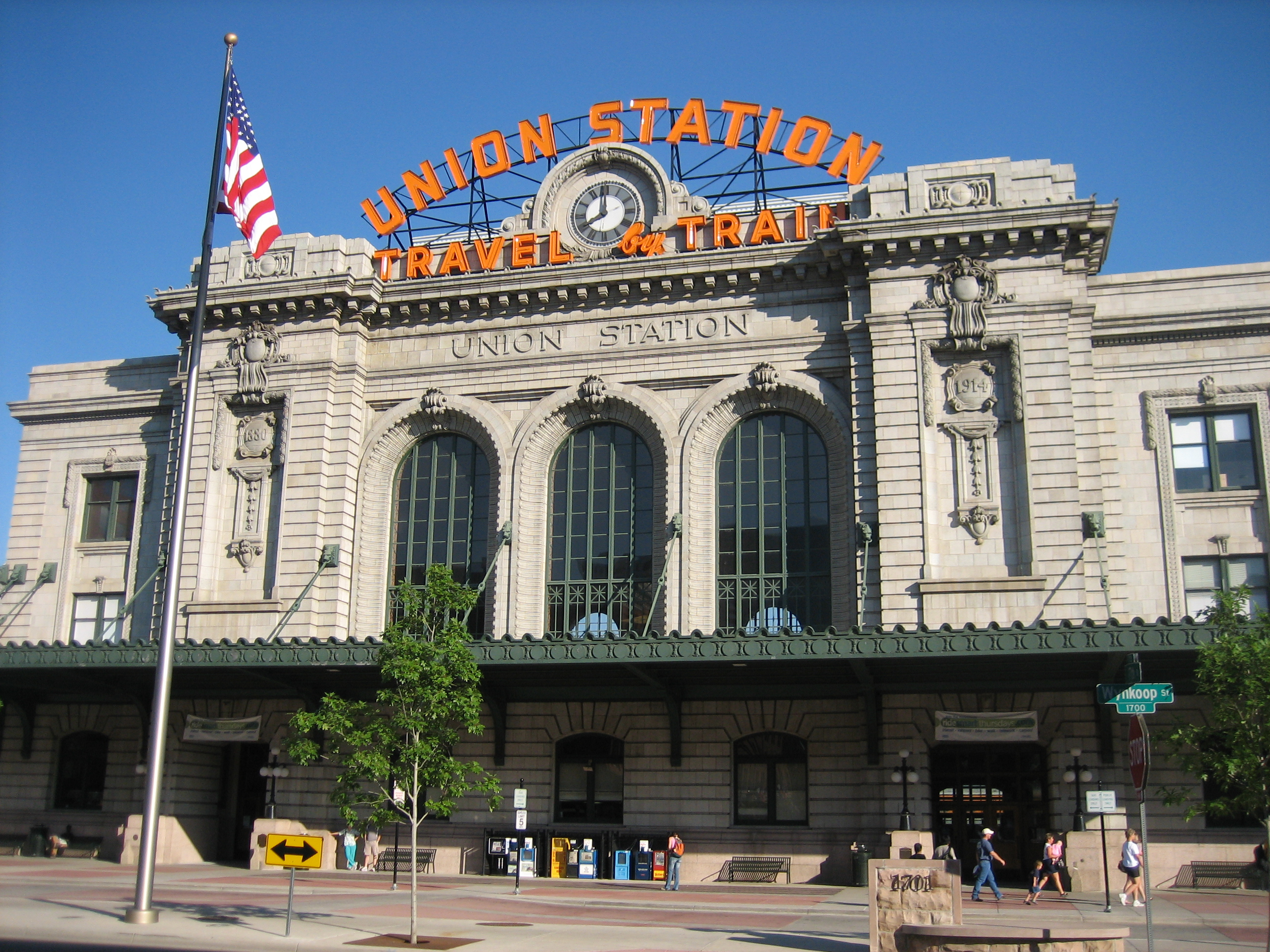
Denver Union Station

- List of National Register of Historic Places in Dolores County, Colorado
- List of National Register of Historic Places in Douglas County, Colorado
- List of National Register of Historic Places in downtown Denver
- List of National Register of Historic Places in Eagle County, Colorado
- List of National Register of Historic Places in El Paso County, Colorado
- List of National Register of Historic Places in Elbert County, Colorado
- List of National Register of Historic Places in Fremont County, Colorado
- List of National Register of Historic Places in Garfield County, Colorado
- List of National Register of Historic Places in Gilpin County, Colorado
- List of National Register of Historic Places in Grand County, Colorado
- List of National Register of Historic Places in Gunnison County, Colorado
- List of National Register of Historic Places in Hinsdale County, Colorado
- List of National Register of Historic Places in Huerfano County, Colorado
- List of National Register of Historic Places in Jackson County, Colorado
- List of National Register of Historic Places in Jefferson County, Colorado

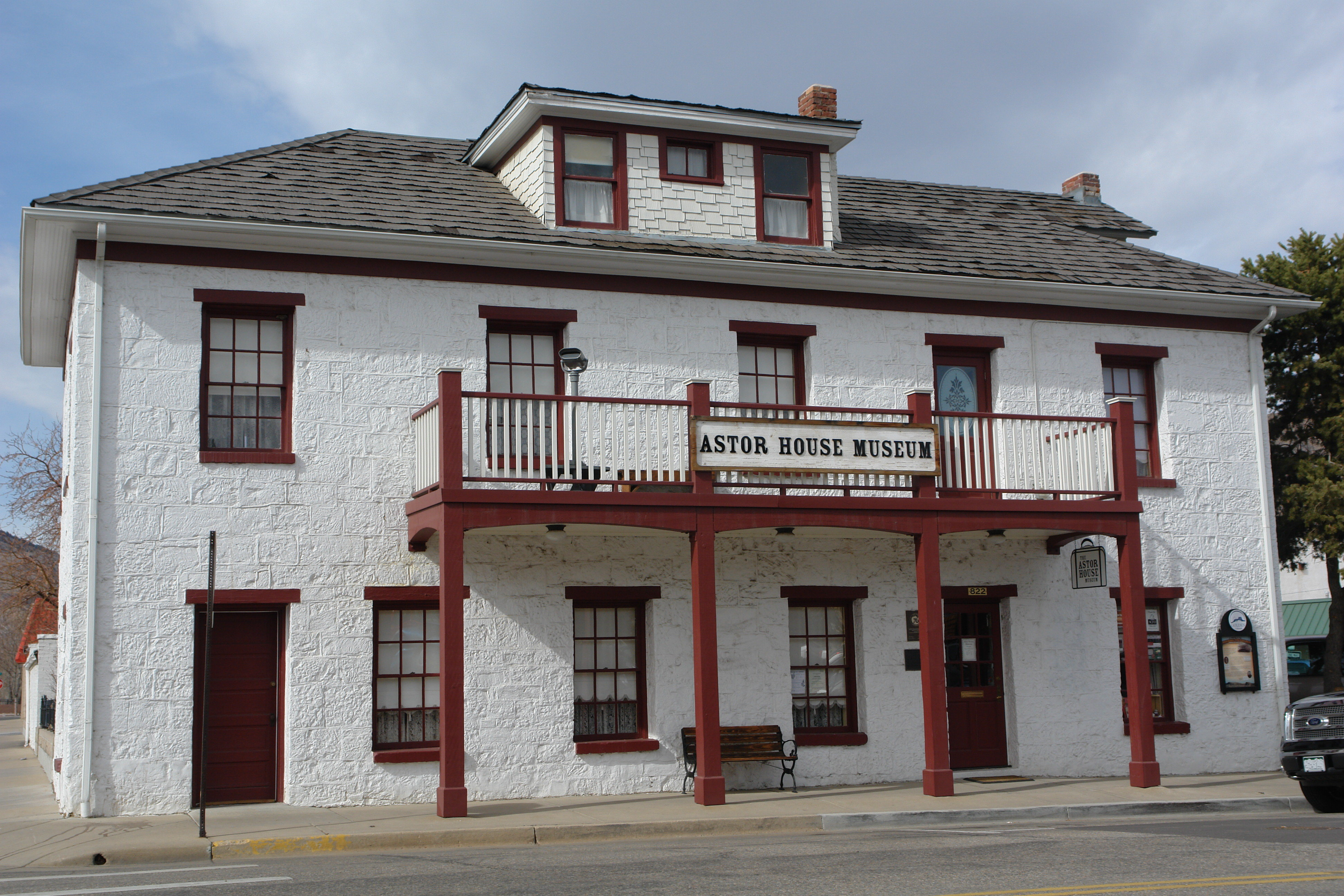
The Astor House in Golden

- List of National Register of Historic Places in Kiowa County, Colorado
- List of National Register of Historic Places in Kit Carson County, Colorado
- List of National Register of Historic Places in La Plata County, Colorado
- List of National Register of Historic Places in Lake County, Colorado
- List of National Register of Historic Places in Larimer County, Colorado
- List of National Register of Historic Places in Las Animas County, Colorado
- List of National Register of Historic Places in Lincoln County, Colorado
- List of National Register of Historic Places in Logan County, Colorado
- List of National Register of Historic Places in Mesa County, Colorado

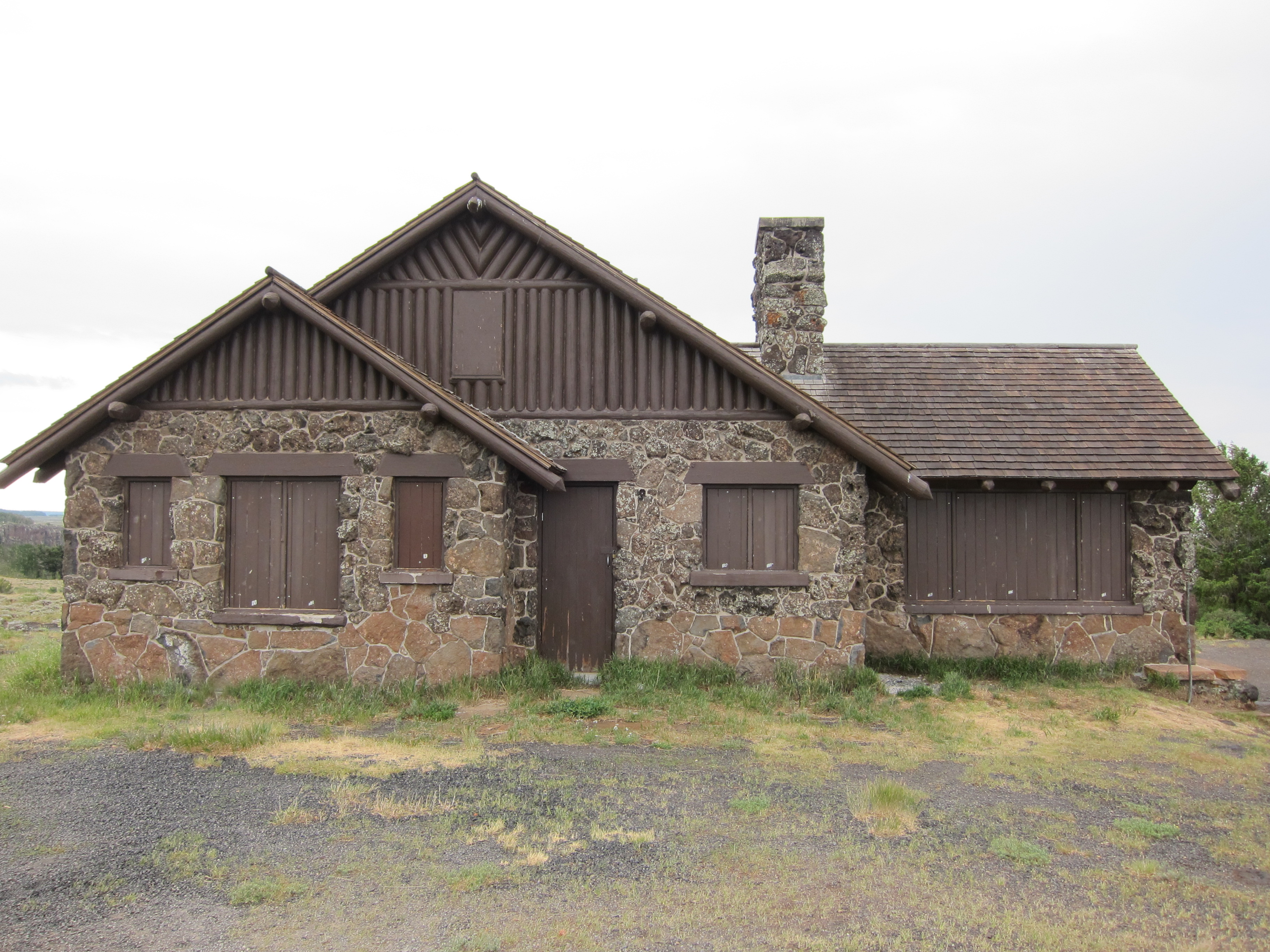
The Land's End Observatory on Grand Mesa

- List of National Register of Historic Places in Mineral County, Colorado
- List of National Register of Historic Places in Moffat County, Colorado
- List of National Register of Historic Places in Montezuma County, Colorado
- List of National Register of Historic Places in Montrose County, Colorado
- List of National Register of Historic Places in Morgan County, Colorado
- List of National Register of Historic Places in northeast Denver
- List of National Register of Historic Places in Otero County, Colorado
- List of National Register of Historic Places in Ouray County, Colorado

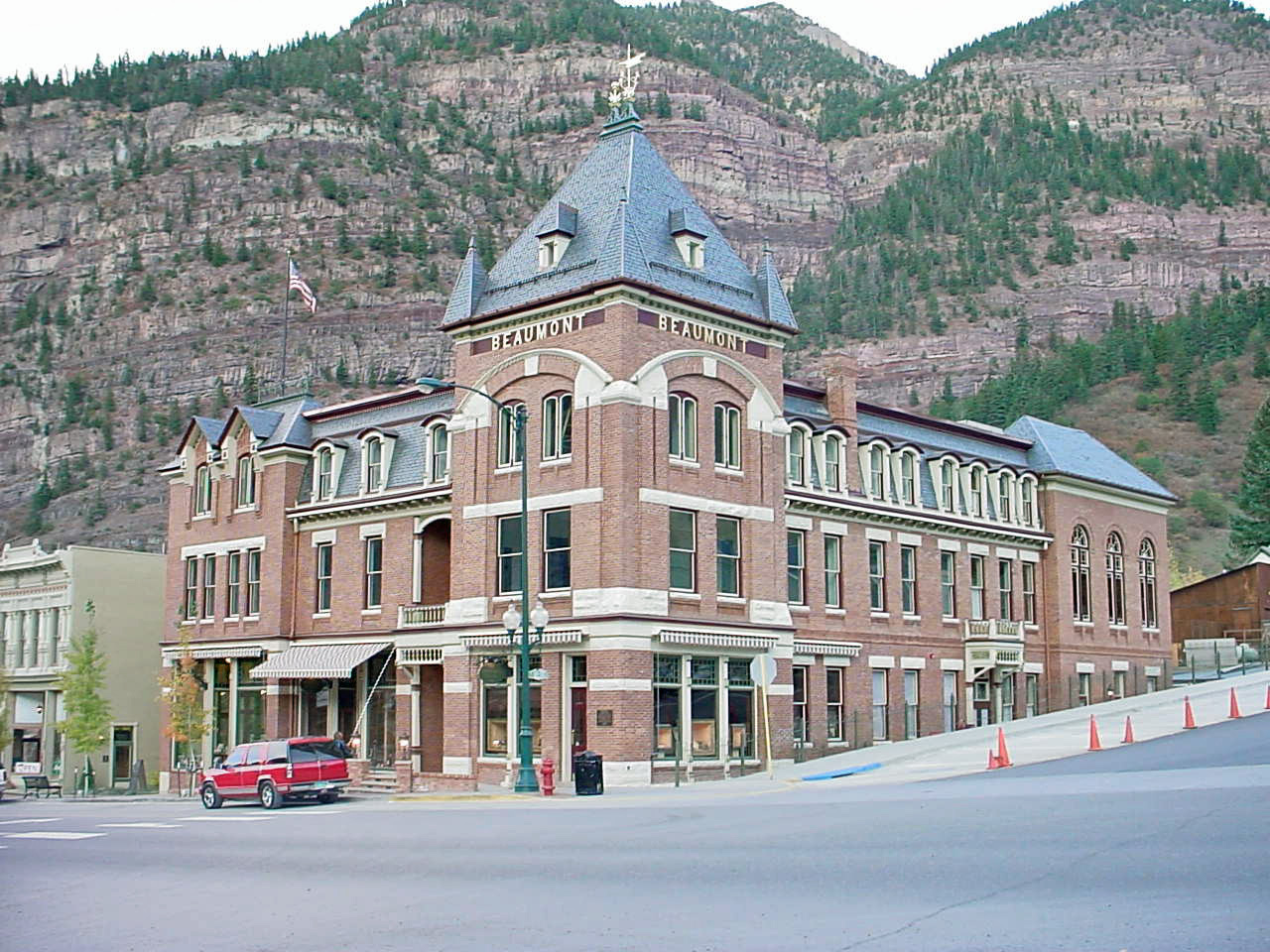
The Beaumont Hotel in Ouray

- List of National Register of Historic Places in Park County, Colorado
- List of National Register of Historic Places in Phillips County, Colorado
- List of National Register of Historic Places in Pitkin County, Colorado
- List of National Register of Historic Places in Prowers County, Colorado
- List of National Register of Historic Places in Pueblo County, Colorado
- List of National Register of Historic Places in Rio Blanco County, Colorado
- List of National Register of Historic Places in Rio Grande County, Colorado
- List of National Register of Historic Places in Routt County, Colorado
- List of National Register of Historic Places in Saguache County, Colorado
- List of National Register of Historic Places in San Juan County, Colorado

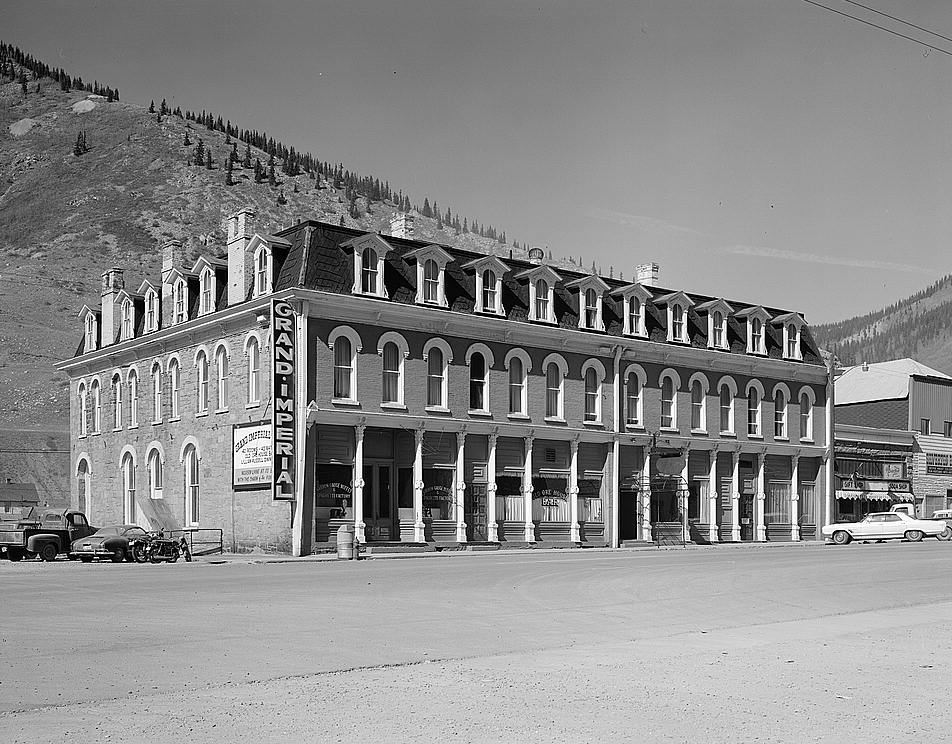
The Grand Imperial Hotel in Silverton

- List of National Register of Historic Places in San Miguel County, Colorado
- List of National Register of Historic Places in Sedgwick County, Colorado
- List of National Register of Historic Places in southeast Denver
- List of National Register of Historic Places in Summit County, Colorado
- List of National Register of Historic Places in Teller County, Colorado
- List of National Register of Historic Places in Washington County, Colorado
- List of National Register of Historic Places in Weld County, Colorado
- List of National Register of Historic Places in west Denver
- List of National Register of Historic Places in Yuma County, Colorado
- List of National Scenic Byways in Colorado
- List of national scenic trails in Colorado

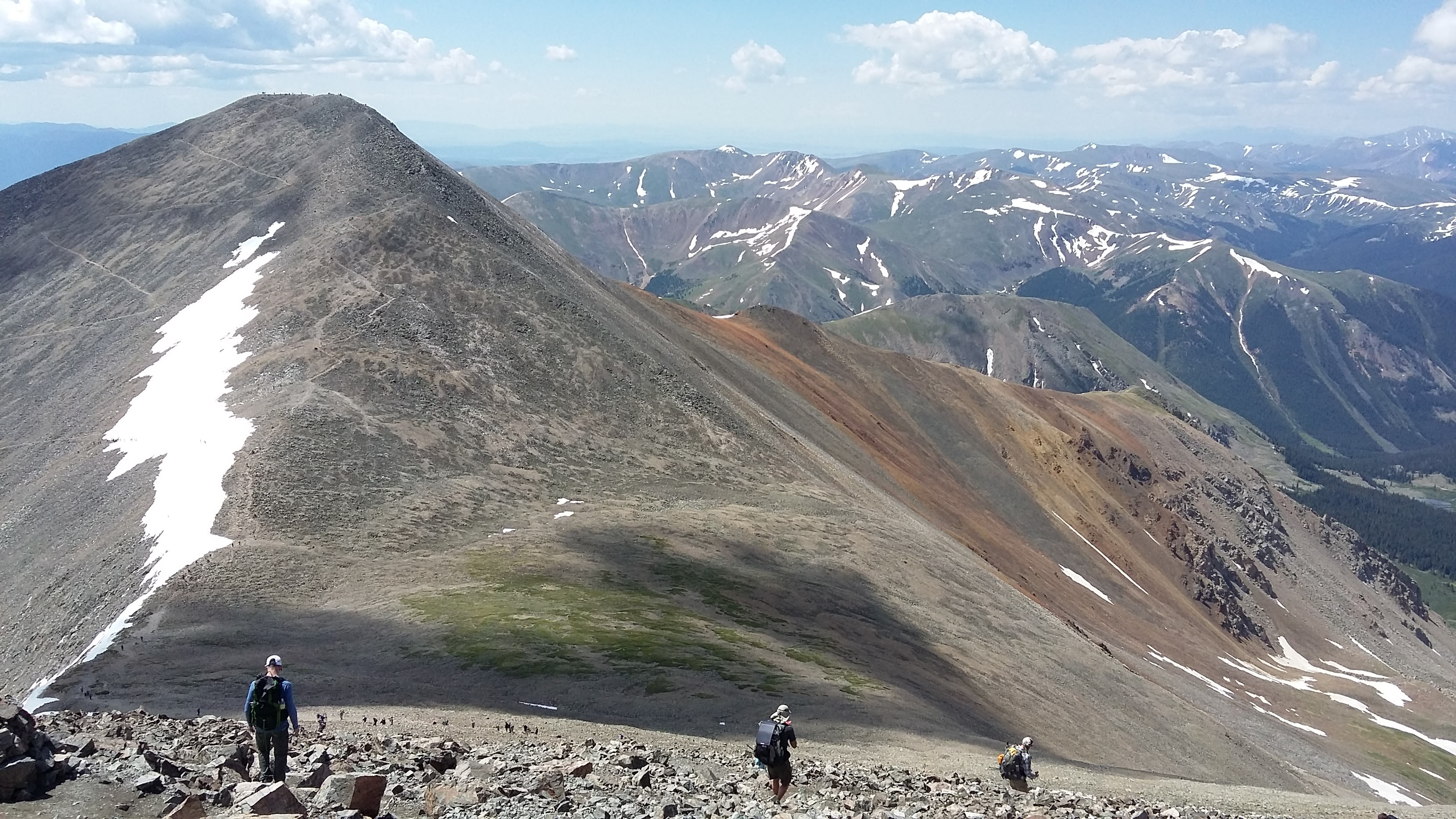
Grays Peak is the highest point on the Continental Divide National Scenic Trail.

- List of national wildernesses in Colorado
- List of national wildlife refuges in Colorado
- List of Native American reservations in Colorado

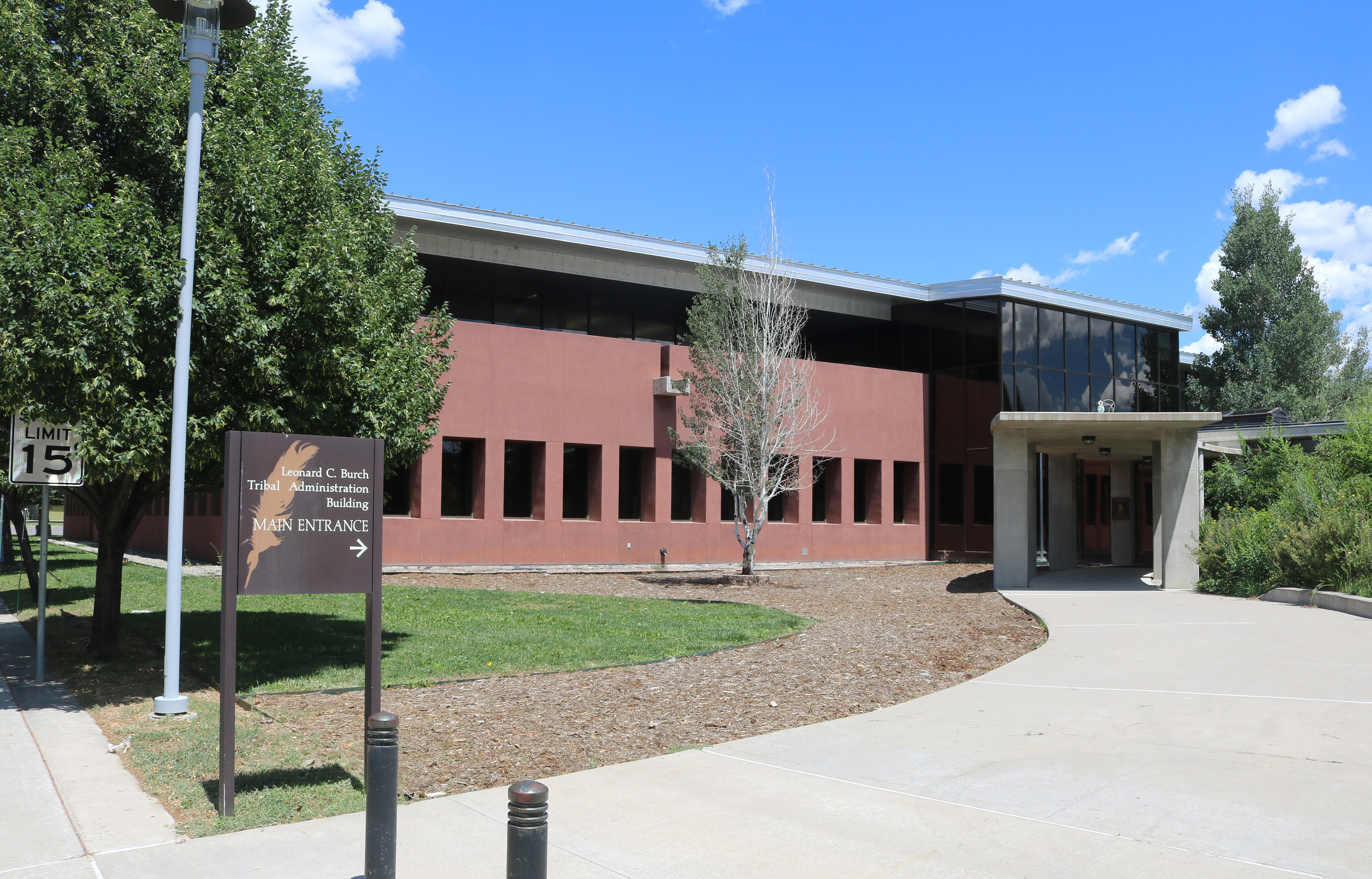
The Southern Ute Tribal Administration Building in Ignacio

- List of nature centers in Colorado
- List of neighborhoods in Denver
- List of newspapers in Colorado
- List of Northern Colorado Bears head football coaches
- List of Northern Colorado Bears in the NFL draft
- List of Northern Colorado Bears men's basketball head coaches
- List of passes of the Rocky Mountains
- List of people from Arvada, Colorado
- List of people from Aspen, Colorado
- List of people from Aurora, Colorado
- List of people from Boulder, Colorado

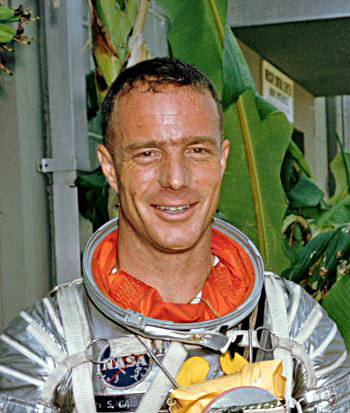
Scott Carpenter

- List of people from Colorado
- List of people from Colorado Springs, Colorado
- List of people from Denver

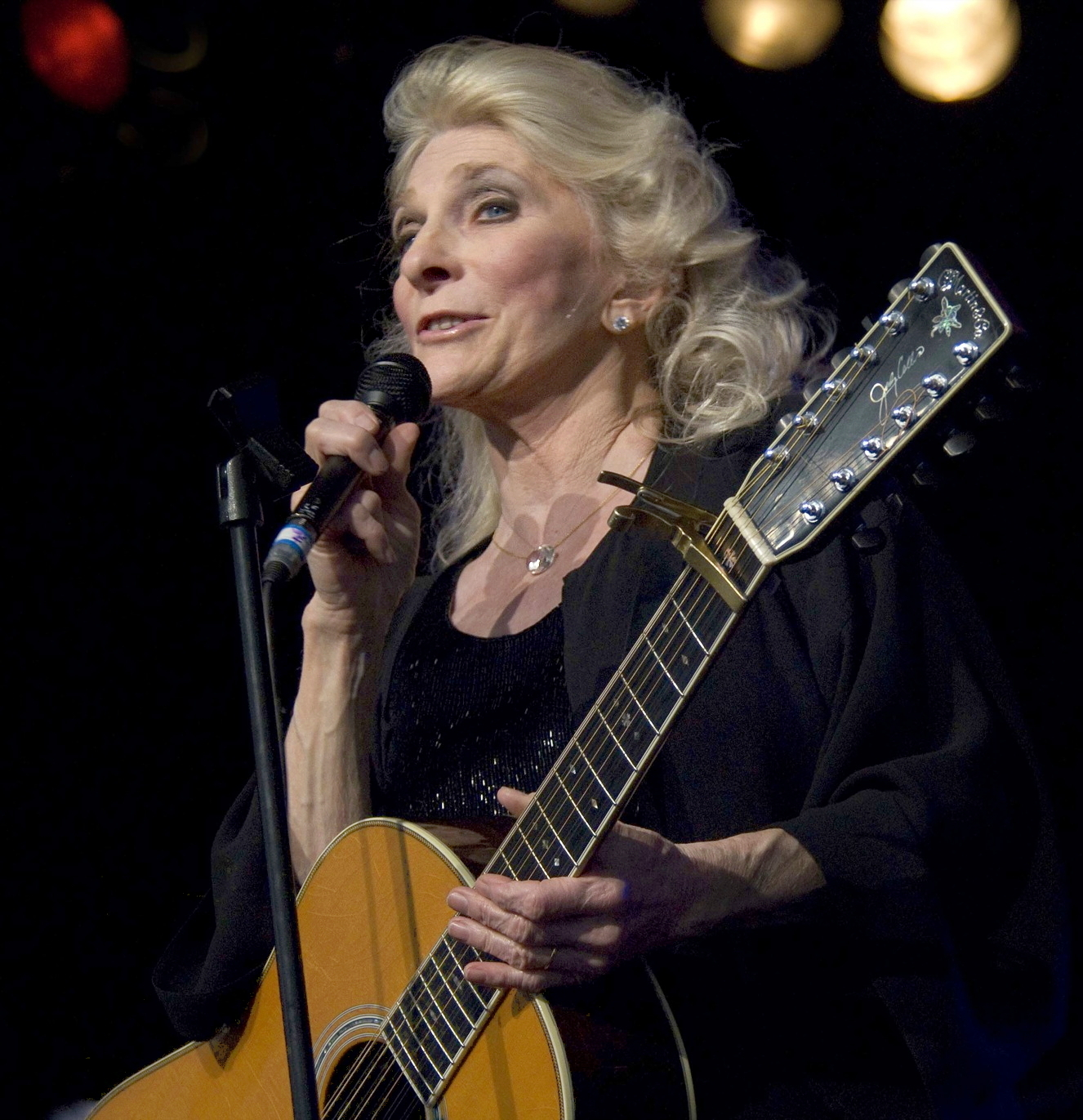
Judy Collins

- List of people from Durango, Colorado
- List of people from Englewood, Colorado
- List of people from Fort Collins, Colorado
- List of people from Glenwood Springs, Colorado
- List of people from Golden, Colorado
- List of people from Greeley, Colorado
- List of people from Highlands Ranch, Colorado
- List of people from La Junta, Colorado
- List of people from Lakewood, Colorado
- List of people from Las Animas, Colorado
- List of people from Littleton, Colorado
- List of people from Trinidad, Colorado
- List of people from Westminster, Colorado
- List of people from Wheat Ridge, Colorado
- List of populated places in Colorado
- List of populated places in Colorado by county
- List of post office buildings on the National Register of Historic Places in Colorado
- List of post offices in Colorado
- List of power stations in Colorado
- List of prehistoric sites in Colorado
- List of professional sports teams of Colorado
- List of protected areas of Colorado
- List of public art in Denver
- List of radio stations in Colorado
- List of regional trails in Colorado

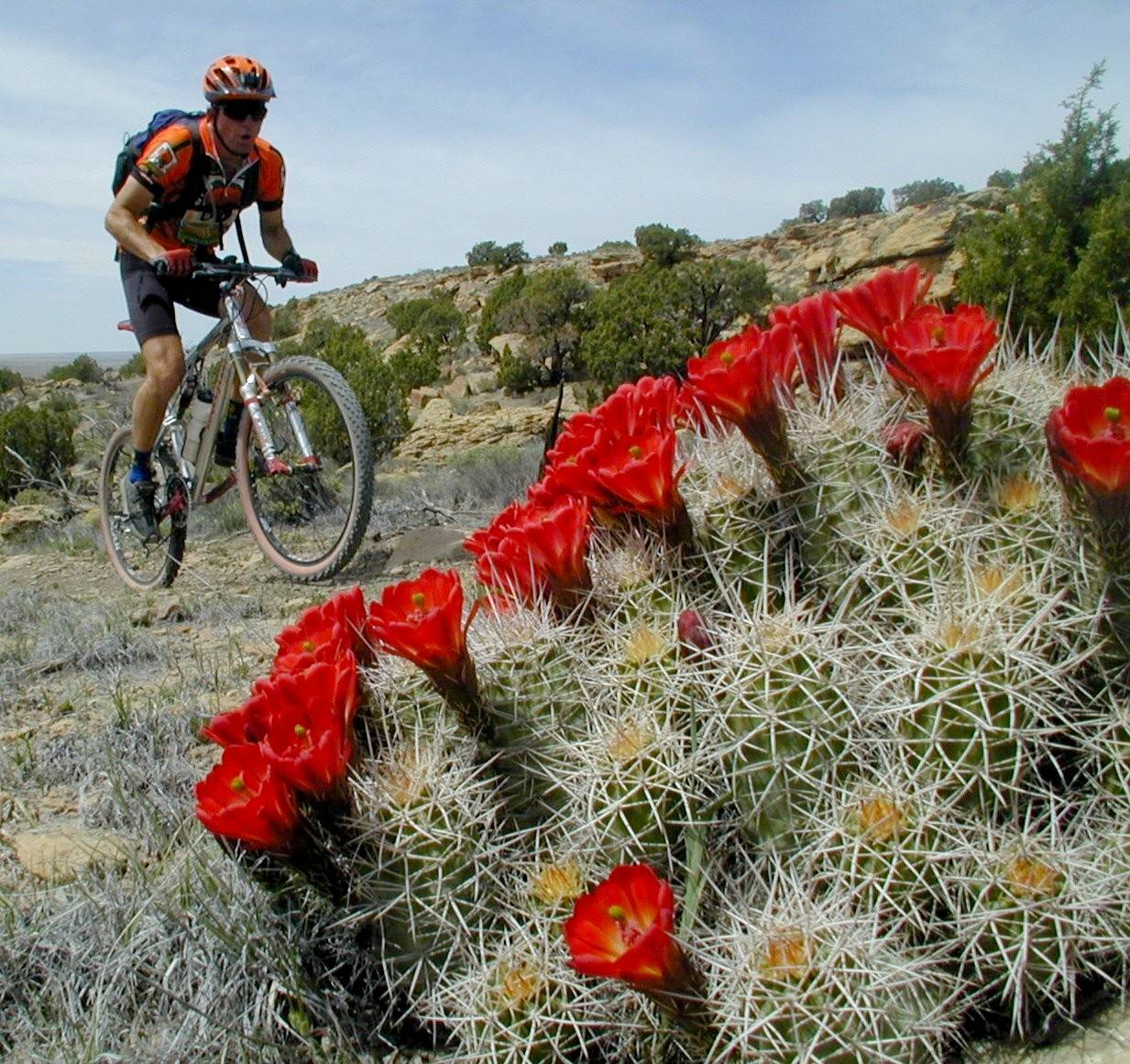
The Kokopelli Trail

- List of reptiles of Colorado
- List of rivers of Colorado

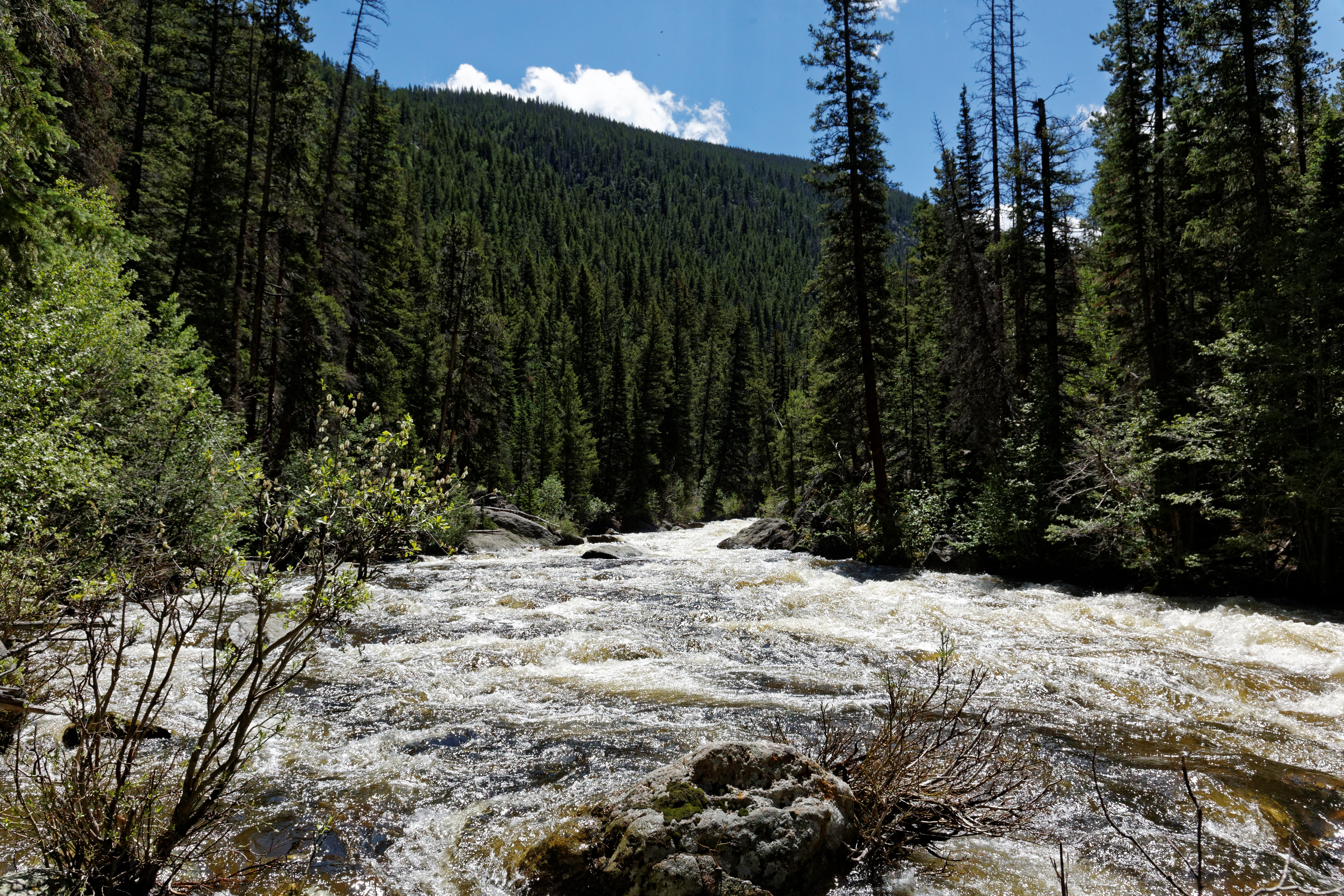
The Cache la Poudre Wild and Scenic River

- List of school districts in Colorado
- List of secretaries of the State of Colorado
- List of secretaries of the Territory of Colorado
- List of ships named the USS Colorado
- List of shootings in Colorado
- List of sister cities in Colorado
- List of sports in Colorado
- List of sports in Denver
- List of state highways in Colorado

A Colorado state highway route marker

- List of statistical areas in Colorado
- List of Superfund sites in Colorado
- List of tallest buildings in Colorado Springs
- List of tallest buildings in Denver
- List of telephone area codes in Colorado
- List of television stations in Colorado
- List of territorial claims and designations in Colorado
- List of the Cenozoic life of Colorado
- List of the highest major summits of Colorado
- List of the highest major summits of the Rocky Mountains
- List of the major 4000-meter summits of Colorado
- List of the major 4000-meter summits of the Rocky Mountains
- List of the Mesozoic life of Colorado

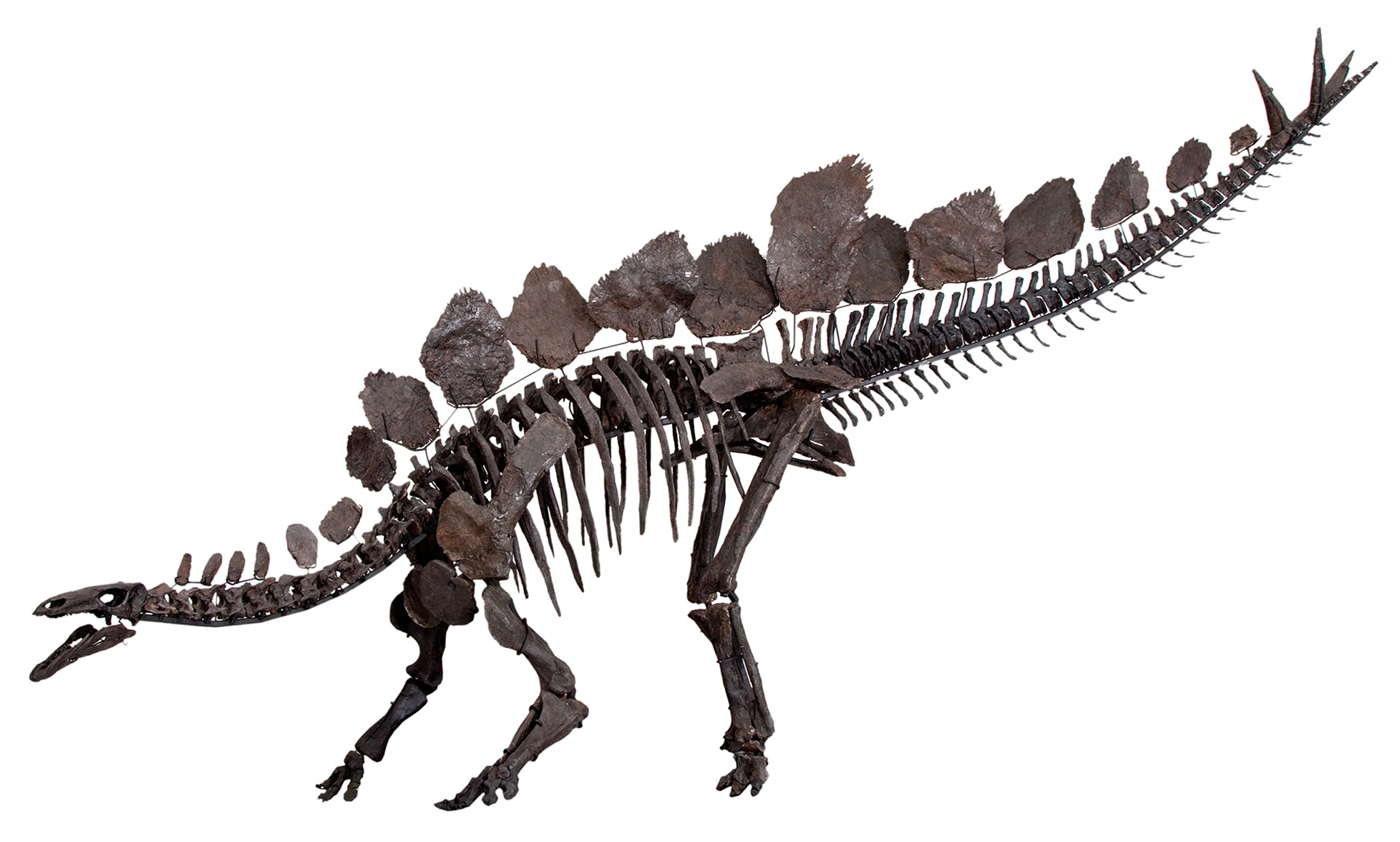
Stegosaurus is the Colorado state fossil.

- List of the most isolated major summits of Colorado
- List of the most isolated major summits of the Rocky Mountains
- List of the most prominent summits of Colorado
- List of the most prominent summits of the Rocky Mountains
- List of the oldest buildings in Colorado
- List of the Paleozoic life of Colorado
- List of the prehistoric life of Colorado
- List of treasurers of the State of Colorado
- List of treasurers of the Territory of Colorado
- List of theaters in Colorado
- List of trading posts in Colorado
- List of tributaries of the Rio Grande
- List of tunnels documented by the Historic American Engineering Record in Colorado
- List of U.S. Highways in Colorado
- List of U.S. postage stamps featuring Colorado
- List of United States Air Force Academy alumni
- List of United States federal courthouses in Colorado
- List of United States representatives from Colorado
- List of United States senators from Colorado
- List of University of Colorado Boulder alumni

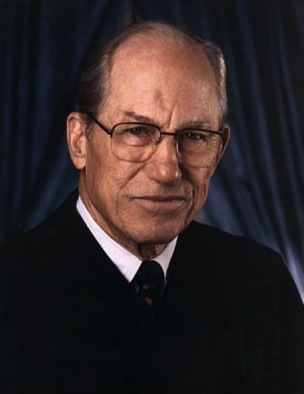
Supreme Court Justice Byron White

- List of University of Denver alumni
- List of waterfalls in Colorado
- List of wild and scenic rivers in Colorado
- List of ZIP codes in Colorado
- Outline of Colorado
- Timeline of Aurora, Colorado
- Timeline of Boulder, Colorado
- Timeline of Colorado history
- Timeline of Colorado Springs, Colorado
- Timeline of Denver
- Timeline of mining in Colorado

== See also ==
- Colorado
  - Bibliography of Colorado
  - Geography of Colorado
    - Colorado Plateau
    - High Plains (United States)
    - Southern Rocky Mountains
  - History of Colorado
    - Prehistory of Colorado
  - Index of Colorado-related articles
  - Outline of Colorado
