= Macklowe =

Macklowe is a surname. Notable people with the surname include:

- Harry B. Macklowe (born 1937), American businessman
- Julie Macklowe (born 1977), American investor
