= Millennium Times Square New York =

Hotel in Manhattan, New York

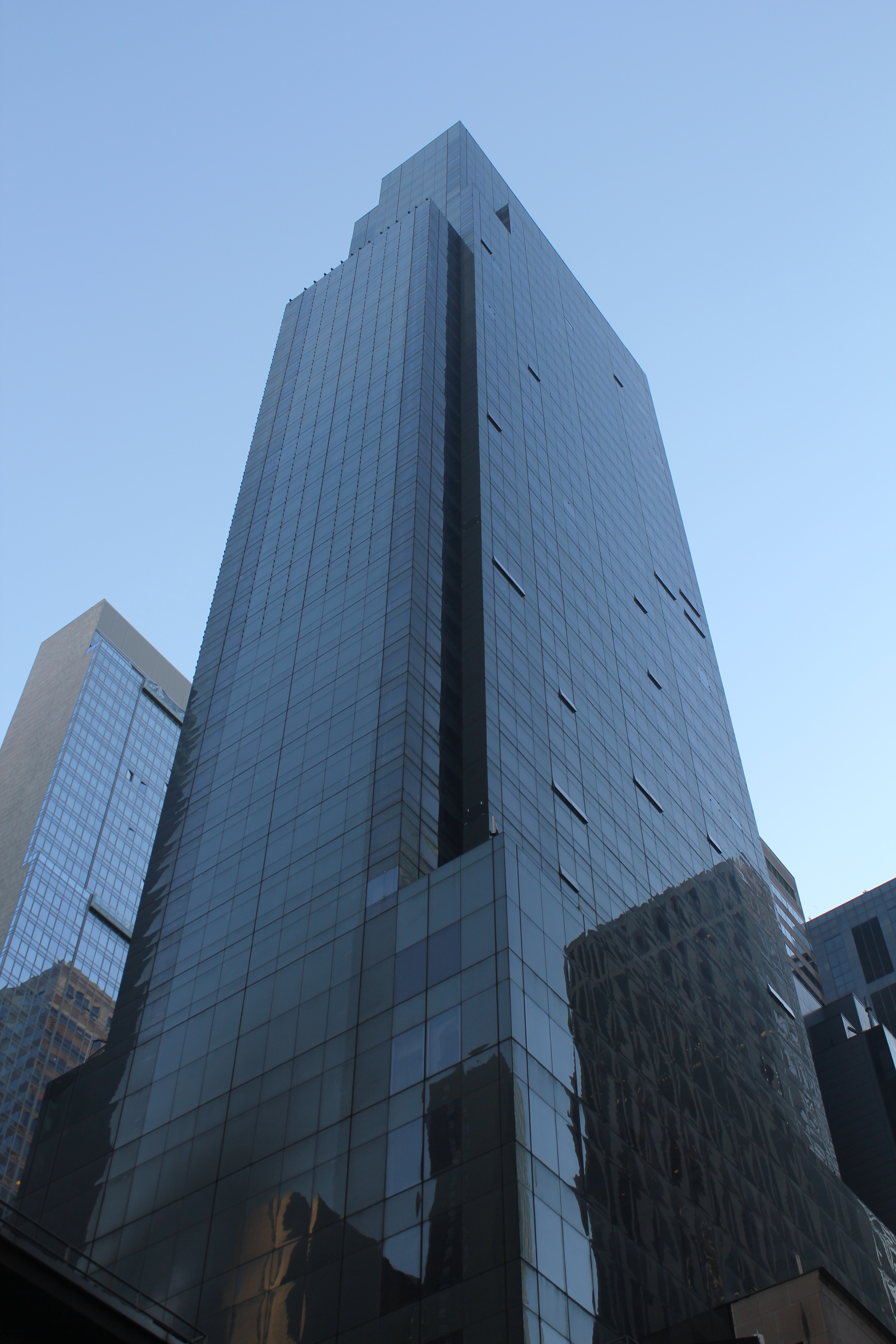
- Hotel chain: Millennium & Copthorne Hotels

General information
- Status: Completed
- Type: Hotel
- Location: 133–145 West 44th Street, New York City, New York, U.S.
- Coordinates: 40°45′26″N 73°59′05″W
- Construction started: 1988
- Completed: 1990
- Opened: May 1990
- Owner: CDL West 45th Street L.P.

Height
- Roof: 481 ft (147 m)
- Top floor: 443 ft (135 m)

Technical details
- Floor count: 48

Design and construction
- Architects: Perkins & Will and William Derman (original); Stonehill & Taylor (Premier annex)
- Developer: Harry B. Macklowe
- Structural engineer: Rosenwasser/Grossman Consulting Engineers, P.C.

Other information
- Number of units: 750
- Number of restaurants: 1
- Number of bars: 1

The Millennium Times Square New York (formerly the Hotel Macklowe and the Millennium Broadway) is a hotel at 133 and 145 West 44th Street, between Times Square and Sixth Avenue, in the Theater District of Midtown Manhattan in New York City, New York, U.S. Operated by Millennium & Copthorne Hotels, the hotel has 750 guest units, as well as a conference center with 33 conference rooms. The hotel incorporates a Broadway theater called the Hudson Theatre into its base.

The hotel is composed of two guestroom towers flanking the Hudson Theatre. The original 48-story tower west of the theater was designed by William Derman and Perkins & Will, while the 22-story annex east of the theater was designed by Stonehill & Taylor. The original hotel tower contains a lobby with a passageway connecting two entrances on 44th and 45th Streets. In addition, there is a bar, restaurant, and fitness center in the original tower. The conference center in the lower stories extended into the Hudson Theatre, which in 2017 became a Broadway theater. The 22-story annex is branded as the Millennium Premier New York Times Square.

The hotel's original tower was developed by Harry Macklowe as the Hotel Macklowe. Though Macklowe had acquired land for the hotel in the early 1980s, he was penalized after illegally demolishing four structures on the site in 1985, and he could not develop the site until 1987. The original tower opened in early 1990 and incorporated the Hudson Theatre into the conference center. Chemical Bank acquired the hotel from Macklowe through foreclosure in 1994, reselling to CDL Hotels, which renamed it the Millennium Broadway. The Millennium Times Square New York was affiliated with the DoubleTree brand of Hilton Hotels & Resorts from 2019 to 2021, after which Highgate was hired to manage the hotel.

== Site ==
The Millennium Times Square New York is at 133–145 West 44th Street, between Seventh Avenue and Sixth Avenue near Times Square, in the Midtown Manhattan neighborhood of New York City, New York, U.S. The hotel is split across two land lots, each with a separate wing of the hotel. The larger lot at 145 West 44th Street covers 16,820 square feet (1,563 m^{2}), with a frontage of 117.42 feet (35.79 m) on 44th Street and a depth of 200 feet (61 m). That site includes the Hudson Theatre, which is between the two wings of the hotel. The smaller lot at 133 West 44th Street covers 6,025 square feet (559.7 m^{2}), with a frontage of 60.25 feet (18.36 m) on 44th Street and a depth of 100 feet (30 m).

The surrounding area is part of Manhattan's Theater District and contains many Broadway theaters. On the same block, 1530 Broadway is to the west and the Hotel Gerard and Belasco Theatre are to the east. Other nearby buildings include the High School of Performing Arts to the northeast, the Lyceum Theatre and 1540 Broadway to the north, One Astor Plaza to the west, 1500 Broadway to the southwest, and the Chatwal New York hotel and the Town Hall to the south. Among the structures that had previously occupied the site were two single room occupancy (SRO) hotels at 143 and 149 West 44th Street, as well as residences. The eastern section of the site, 133 West 44th Street, had been occupied by the Newspaper Guild from 1946 to the late 1990s.

== Architecture ==
The Millennium Times Square New York consists of two wings flanking the Hudson Theatre. The section west of the theater was originally developed by Harry Macklowe as the Hotel Macklowe. The building has 48 stories according to the New York City Department of City Planning (DCP), (Note: It is also variously described as being 47 or 52 stories tall.) and a height of 481 feet (147 m). Macklowe's in-house architect William Derman, as well as Perkins & Will, were responsible for the final design. The firm of Gruzen Samton Steinglass had been involved in preliminary designs, but that company was replaced by Perkins & Will during development. To the east of the theater is a 22-story annex, developed in 1999 for Millennium & Copthorne Hotels. The annex was designed by Stonehill & Taylor and Kiat Supattapone; it is known as the Millennium Premier New York Times Square.

=== Form and facade ===
The facade of the Hudson Theatre is incorporated into the base of the tower. The architectural firm of J. B. McElfatrick & Son was the theater's original architect, but the firm of Israels & Harder oversaw the completion of the theater's design. Both the theater's 44th and 45th Street elevations are clad in tan brick with Flemish bond. The four-story 44th Street elevation, serving as the theater's primary entrance, is divided into five vertical bays and contains entrance doors at ground level. The five-story 45th Street elevation is comparatively plain in design and has little decoration.

Macklowe acquired the unused air rights of the Hudson Theatre to make the original tower taller than would normally be allowed under zoning laws. The first seven stories of the hotel are made of stone, designed in a classical style to complement the Hudson Theatre. The main entrance is at 44th Street, while the convention center entrance is at 45th Street. The 44th Street entrance is flanked by silver sconces and contains a canopy. The rest of the hotel was designed in a modern style because, according to William Derman, it would appeal to "high-tech clients". The facade of the upper stories is made of dark glass.

A wall of Deer Isle granite was built in front of the lower stories of the annex, also complementing the theater; it was designed as a standalone slab rather than as a portion of the annex's facade. The entirety of the annex is set back from the stone wall, recessed from the lot line. According to Paul David Taylor of Stonehill & Taylor, the zoning regulations would have required a setback at a low height if the hotel had been built out to the lot line.

=== Features ===
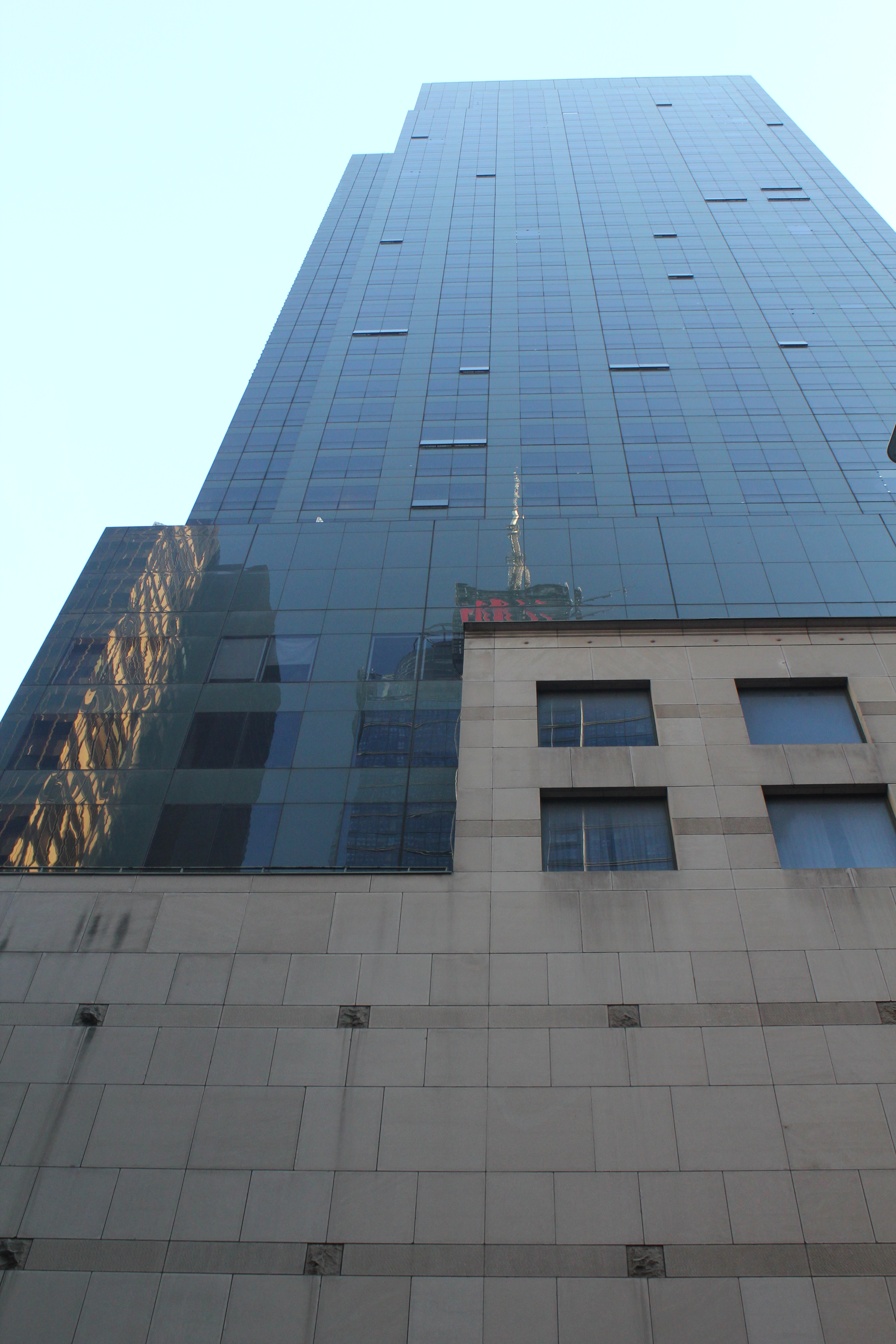
Seen from the street

According to the DCP, the hotel has 471,985 square feet (43,848.8 m^{2}) of gross floor area. The original hotel building was also designed with 60,000 square feet (5,600 m^{2}) of office space. The original hotel was designed with a superstructure made of concrete. The hotel has 750 rooms across its two towers: 625 in the original hotel and 125 in the Premier annex.

==== Lobby ====
Within the original hotel building, the two entrances are connected by a passageway running the entire block, which functions as a privately owned public space. The southern end of the lobby contains a waiting area on the western wall and the Hudson Theatre on the eastern wall. The center of the lobby has a concierge, hotel check-in desk, stairs, and elevators, while the northern end of the lobby includes a gift shop. The walls contain Day-Night, a pair of oil paintings by Carlo Maria Mariani, which depict an awake man and a sleeping woman. The lobby is also decorated in wood and black marble. Derman designed the original decorations, which included gray-and-black carpets evocative of Rockefeller Center's interiors. The convention-center lobby was designed with mahogany, a reference to the decorative scheme at the Four Seasons Restaurant. The elevator cabs were clad in mahogany and steel. Because the original hotel and the Hudson Theatre were already ornately decorated with marble, the Premier annex was clad in simpler marble.

The hotel was designed with one bar and one full-service restaurant. Ali Barker was the original executive chef for the hotel's restaurant. Originally, the restaurant was known as Restaurant Charlotte, which offered both full-service meals and afternoon tea. When the hotel passed under Millennium ownership, the restaurant space became the Bugis Street Brasserie and Bar, serving Singaporean cuisine.

==== Guestrooms ====
When the Hotel Macklowe was built, it was variously cited as containing 635, 637, or 638 rooms. Each room had a television that allowed visitors to look for and purchase tickets for airlines, theaters, sports events, and other attractions. The service was branded as "MackTel" and could also be used to request room service. The rooms' decorations were designed with a black and tan color scheme, cherry-wood headboards, and Art Deco armchairs. Rooms were also designed with marble-topped writing desks that contained minibars underneath. Harry Macklowe's then-wife Linda decorated the rooms with prints from architects such as Michael Graves, Zaha Hadid, Arata Isozaki, Rem Koolhaas, Daniel Libeskind, Morphosis Architects, and Bernard Tschumi.

As of 2021, the Millennium Times Square New York contains 625 rooms. These consist of "standard rooms" of 238 square feet (22.1 m^{2}) each, "superior rooms" of 240 square feet (22 m^{2}) each, and "deluxe rooms" of 350 square feet (33 m^{2}) each. The rooms are spread through floors 16 through 52. Higher units contain views of Times Square and the skyline of New York City. he "Millennium Suites" are at the top of the original hotel tower and cover 580 square feet (54 m^{2}) each. The rooms have writing desks, European tubs, and full-height windows. On the 16th floor is a private fitness center. It contains a massage room, steam room, and a sauna, as well as a room containing weights and exercise machines.

The 22-story Premier at Millennium Broadway is on the east side of the Hudson Theatre and is designed with 125 units. The annex has six units per floor on average. Each of the units has European tubs, full-height windows, three telephone lines, a modem hookup, and a fax machine. The public corridors of each floor were originally decorated with color photographs from The New York Times. There is also a mezzanine containing the Premier Lounge and Boardroom, which serves breakfast and evening cocktails. As of 2021, the Millennium Premier New York Times Square has "premier rooms" of 330 square feet (31 m^{2}), "deluxe rooms" of 365 square feet (33.9 m^{2}), and "executive rooms" of 405 square feet (37.6 m^{2}).

==== Conference center ====
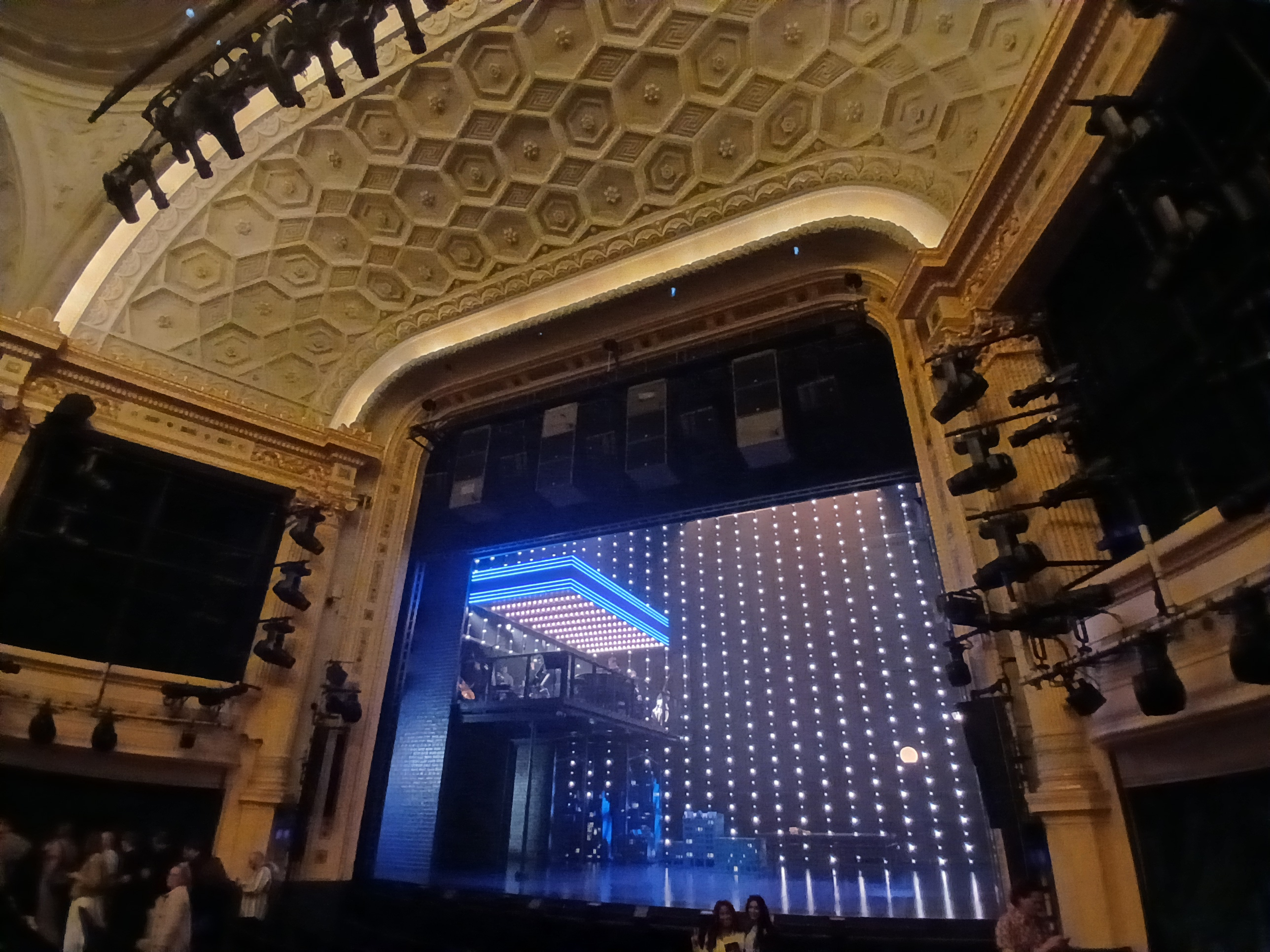
The Hudson Theatre, formerly part of the hotel's conference center

The hotel's conference center is placed on the first five floors of the hotel. (Note: Sources also cite three floors and four floors.) and covers 100,000 square feet (9,300 m^{2}). It was originally known as the Macklowe Conference Center and included 33 conference rooms. (Note: One source cites a different figure of 38 conference rooms.) These are composed of 12 smaller rooms, 15 medium-sized rooms, and six auditorium spaces. The rooms could fit between five and 125 people. When the hotel opened, each of the meeting rooms had custom furniture and lights, as well as modern audiovisual equipment. The rooms also had leather chairs and their own thermostats. The conference center as a whole had word-processing and secretarial services, fax machines, photocopiers, photographers, and a graphics studio. Internet kiosks occupy the second floor, and the roof had satellites to supplement the conference center. There is also a catering service.

The conference center originally extended into the Hudson Theatre, which was converted into the conference center's auditorium when the hotel was built. A new deck, dressing rooms, and stage rigging were added to the theater, and a projectionists' booth and a Dolby sound system were installed as part of the conversion. The auditorium has an orchestra level, boxes, two balconies, promenades on the three seating levels, and a large stage behind the proscenium arch. The auditorium's width is slightly greater than its depth, and the auditorium is designed with plaster decorations in high relief. The auditorium had a capacity of 700 guests when it was being used for theater-style events, but this could be converted to a banquet-style space for 300 guests. In addition to independent corporate events, weddings were hosted in the theater. After its conversion back into a Broadway theater in 2017, the Hudson Theatre has had 970 seats.

== History ==
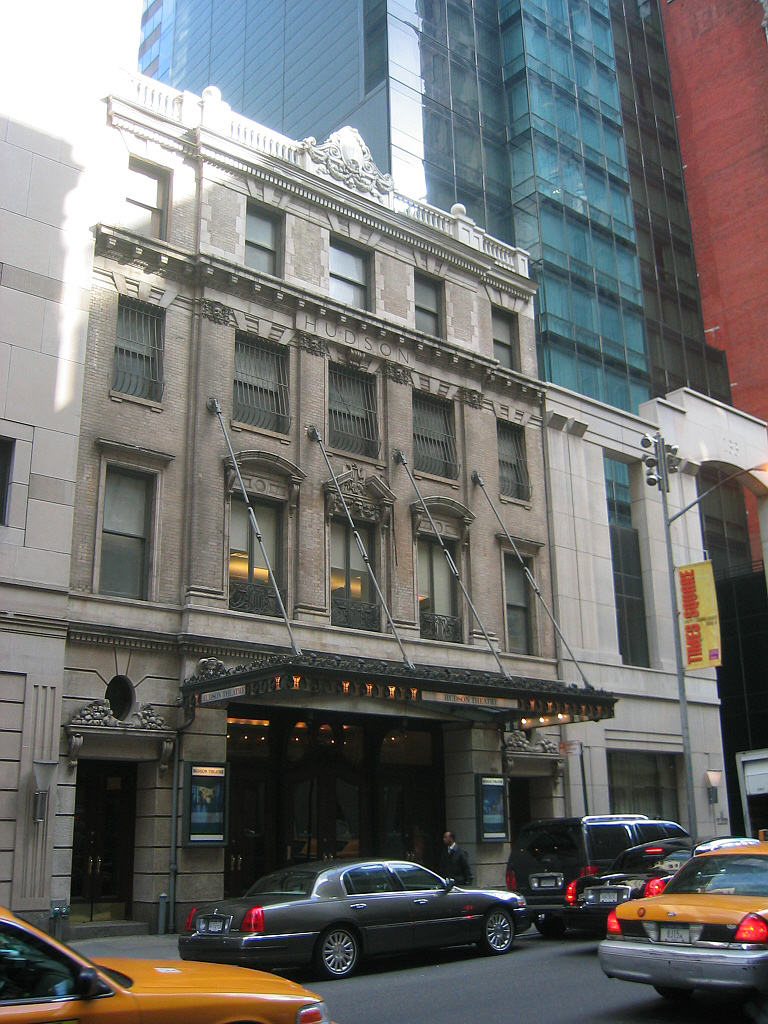
The Hudson Theatre, flanked by the hotel, existed prior to the hotel's development.

The Hudson Theatre opened in 1903. It was originally operated by Henry B. Harris, and then his widow Renee Harris, until the Great Depression. It then served as a network radio studio for CBS from 1934 to 1937 and as an NBC television studio from 1949 to 1960. The Hudson operated intermittently as a Broadway theater until the 1960s and subsequently served as a porn theater, a nightclub called the Savoy, and a movie theater. As early as the mid-1970s, U.S. Steel was attempting to redevelop the surrounding city block.

=== Development ===
==== Site clearing ====
Harry Macklowe acquired several properties on the block in the mid-1980s, including the Hudson Theatre in May 1984. He wanted to develop a 600,000-square-foot (56,000 m^{2}) tower on the site. The development of the lot started with a highly controversial demolition. Macklowe paid Mitran Associates $380,000 to demolish four structures at 143–149 West 44th Street during the night of January 7, 1985; at the time, Sol Goldman was selling him the buildings, but the sale had not yet been finalized. The demolition was carried out without either obtaining the necessary permits or disconnecting the utility lines. Macklowe had been motivated by a desire to avoid a pending moratorium that would have prevented the demolition or conversion of SROs across the city for 18 months, which would take effect on January 9. Macklowe had told John Tassi to tell Eddie Garofalo, who headed Mitran, that the buildings were being demolished on Goldman's behalf. This would subsequently lead to perjury charges in association with the demolition.

The city government sought to imprison the responsible parties, and Manhattan district attorney Robert Morgenthau indicted both Goldman and Garofalo. Morgenthau sent the case to a grand jury, saying the defendants' failure to disconnect utility lines had constituted reckless endangerment. Macklowe paid a $2 million fine, and the city gave the money to the Franciscans, which used it to fund a development for the homeless. Initially, Macklowe had been planning an office tower for the site, but that had been delayed due to the controversy over the illegal demolition. Garofalo was found guilty of reckless endangerment, but he was given a conditional discharge absolving him from all charges if he did not get in any other legal trouble for a year. After being acquitted of perjury in May 1986, Garofalo sued Macklowe for defamation. In 1988, on the third anniversary of the demolition, the New York Supreme Court ruled that Garofalo had to pay more than $1.5 million in damages to the New York City government. The ruling judge said: "That nobody was hurt and other property and people were not damaged is purely fortuitous."

Development of the tower was deadlocked for years due to legal troubles. A New York City Council ordinance had prohibited any structures on the site from being developed for four years; this action was meant to deter other developers from making similar demolitions for their own projects. The City Council quietly overturned the ban on developing the 44th Street site in January 1987, two years early. The administration of mayor Ed Koch had suggested the ban be overturned because of concerns that the ban was unconstitutional. The SRO moratorium was extended by five years at a council vote that year. The New York Daily News reported at the time that the moratorium would prevent the redevelopment of the Lenox Hotel at 149 West 44th Street, which stood in the way of Macklowe's project. Later that year, Macklowe paid the city $2.65 million so he could finish razing the 29,400-square-foot (2,730 m^{2}) Lenox Hotel site.

==== Construction ====
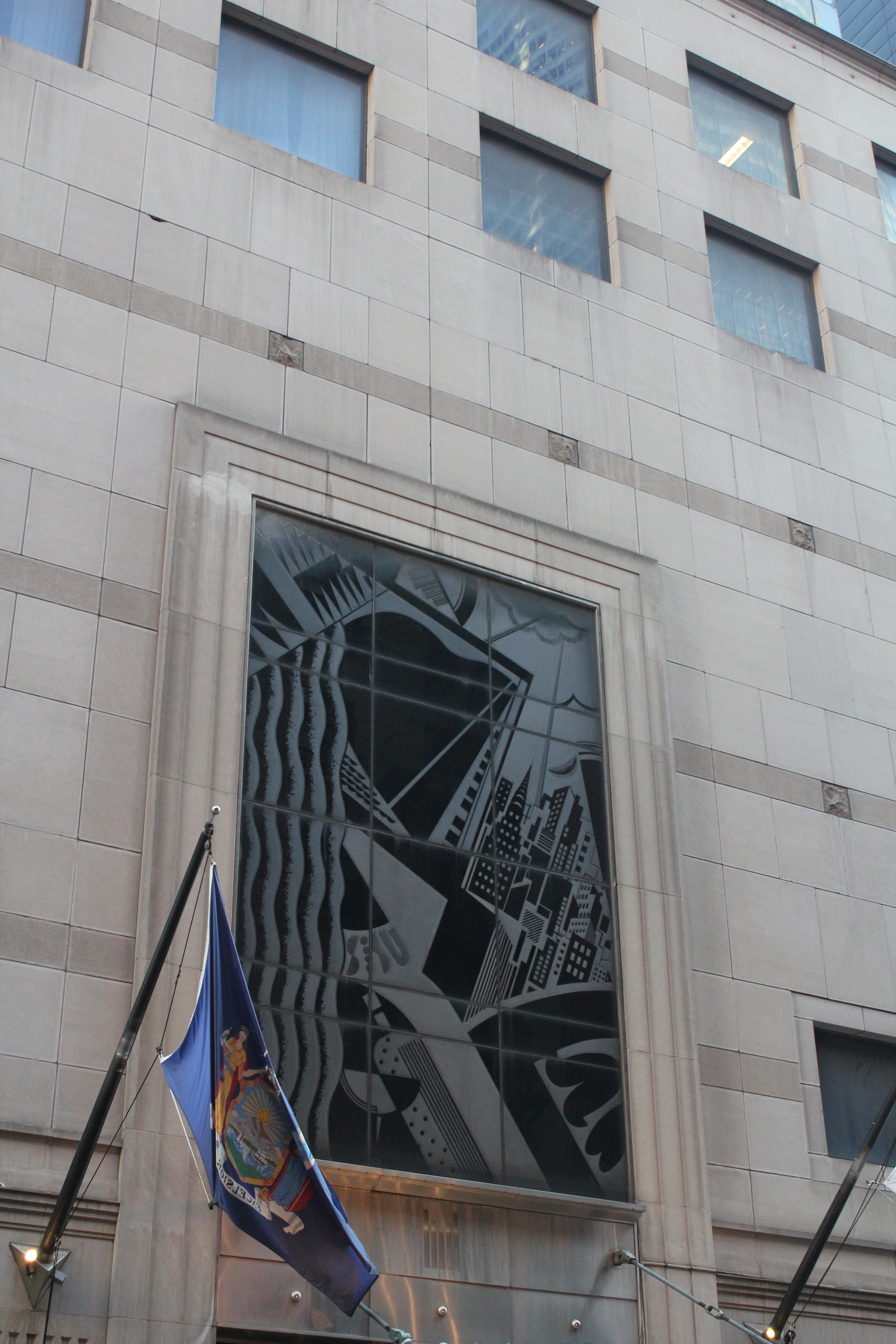
Entrance of the original hotel

By early 1988, Macklowe was developing a hotel on the 44th Street site. A spokesperson for the New York City Department of Buildings said at the time that, since the SRO moratorium had expired, Macklowe was allowed to develop the site. In addition, Macklowe had been granted a zoning bonus that allowed the hotel to be built with 20 percent more space than the maximum that was normally allowed in the zoning district. Had Macklowe commenced the hotel as originally scheduled, he would not have been granted the bonus. Macklowe also received $3.3 million in restitution from the city government after the New York Court of Appeals found the SRO moratorium to be illegal. He also received tax abatements under the Industrial and Commercial Development Incentive program.

The project was managed by Kent Swig, who was Macklowe Properties' vice president and Harry Macklowe's son-in-law. McCaffrey & McCall was hired as the marketing agent for the hotel. Because this was to be the first hotel in the Macklowe chain, all staff had to be newly hired, unlike in more established chains where more senior staff was transferred from other hotels. During the hotel's construction, models of guestrooms and conference rooms were built on the Hudson Theatre's stage.

In January 1989, the media reported how the City Council had previously overturned the ban on developing the site. Some of the council members who had voted to overturn the ban said they did not realize they had voted to do so. Harrison J. Goldin, the New York City Comptroller, ordered an investigation into the matter, saying Macklowe had signed a legal agreement in which he had accepted the ban. Goldin also urged the city government to issue a "stop work" order on the hotel. By then, the structure had been built to either the 25th story or had surpassed the 30th story. Koch had given conflicting explanations, first saying the ban had been revoked through legal channels, then suggested that council members did not read the legislation closely. A critic in The New York Times said "the law was repealed, almost as furtively as Mr. Macklowe's crew had cleared the site". At least one City Council member, Carol Greitzer, wanted the council to protest the fact that Macklowe planned to name the development "Hotel Macklowe". Protests over the demolitions continued in later years, as in 1998, when artists posted signs on lampposts outside the hotel referencing the demolitions.

=== Operation ===
==== Macklowe ownership ====
Before the hotel's opening, Swig indicated that the hotel might charge $125 per room per night. Swig indicated in November 1989 that there were already 100,000 overnight bookings for the hotel. Macklowe Hotel opened in May 1990. It was one of three new hotels around Times Square at the time, the others being the Crowne Plaza Times Square Manhattan and the Embassy Suites Times Square. Following the previous year's attack of a Central Park jogger, the hotel offered a paid service wherein a personal trainer would accompany guests while jogging in Central Park. The Hotel Macklowe advertised it as New York City's "only institutionalized hotel jogging service". The hotel's other services included a wardrobe service for frequent guests, as well as the ticket reservation services within guest rooms. One of the hotel's promotions included an offering of Broadway tickets and a dinner, while another provided personalized bathrobes with guests' initials. Senior citizens were given discounts.

The adjacent Hudson Theatre was renovated for $7 million. The theater was to serve as an auditorium for independent events, including corporate meetings, fashion shows, and product launches. The hotel's opening had coincided with a nationwide recession. To promote the convention center during mid-1990, the Hotel Macklowe ran a promotion in which large groups were allowed to use the meeting facilities for free on their second day. Among the events in the conference center was the World Chess Championship 1990, where Russian Grandmasters Garry Kasparov and Anatoly Karpov competed in New York City's first World Chess Championship since 1907. The conference center also hosted events such as a reel of highlights from the Banff Television Festival in 1991, as well as a publishing conference in 1992. The hotel's management wished to attract fashion shows to the conference center as well, despite the relatively small size of Hudson Theatre's stage. The conference center was particularly popular for announcements of corporate acquisitions and mergers.

By early 1993, hospitality analysts predicted that the Hotel Macklowe and several other New York City hotels were facing financial issues that would force them to be placed for sales. Later that year, Macklowe defaulted on several million dollars of debt on his other properties. Chemical Bank took over the hotel in February 1994 after Macklowe defaulted on the hotel's mortgage. The bank immediately sought to sell it. In September 1994, Chemical arranged to sell the hotel to Kwek Leng Beng of Singaporean chain CDL International for about $100 million. The transaction valued the hotel at nearly $164,000 per room. At that point, half of the hotel's revenue came from conferences; the services included a $100,000 charge for broadcasting an event to live attendees at ten other sites. After buying the hotel, Kwek hired outside management to operate it.

==== Millennium ownership ====
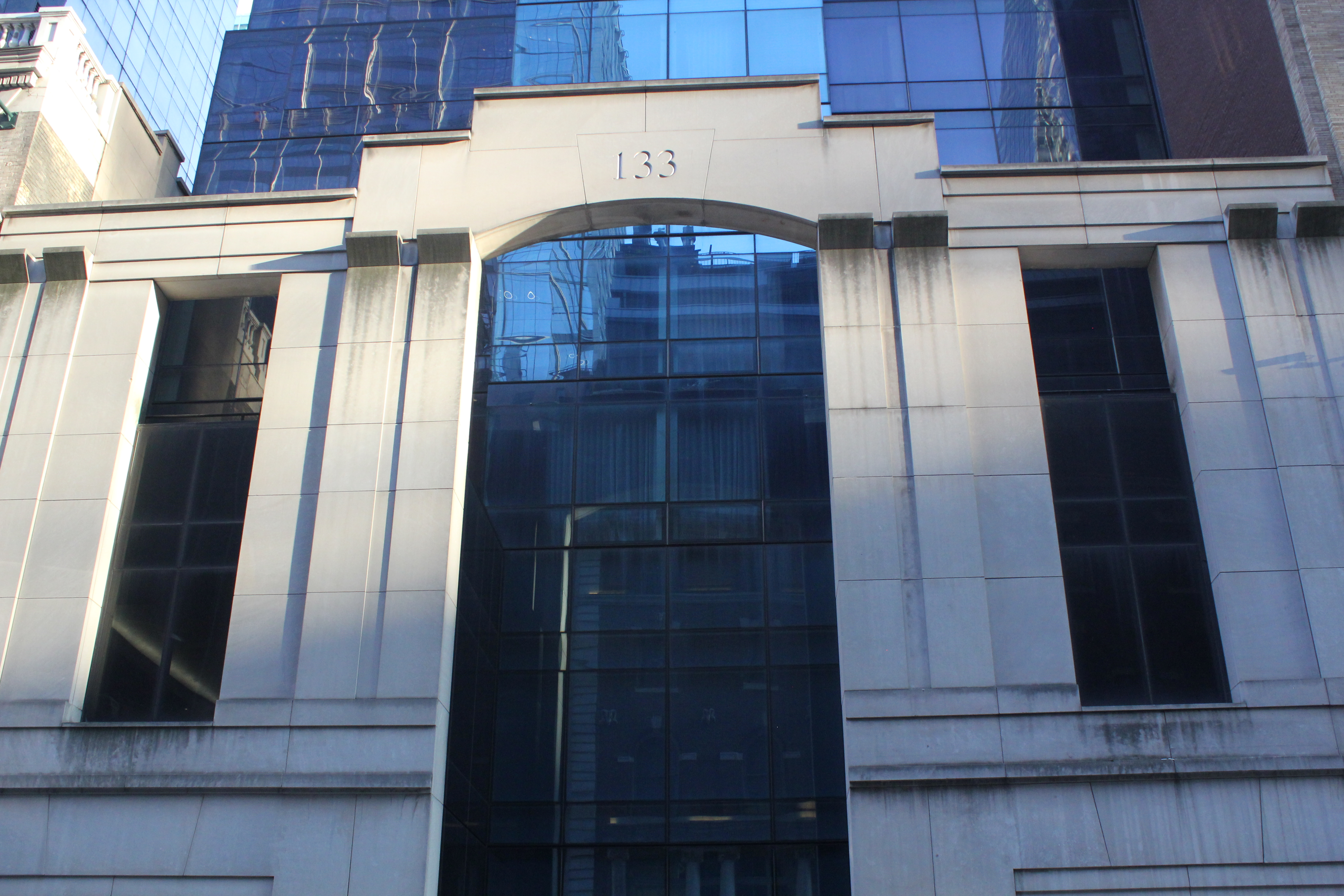
Entrance to Millennium Premier addition

CDL changed the Hotel Macklowe's name to the Millennium Broadway in October 1995, with Millennium & Copthorne Hotels operating the hotel. CDL acquired the adjacent Newspaper Guild building for $3.4 million in December 1996. The Newspaper Guild had a three-story building and 54,000 square feet (5,000 m^{2}) of air rights, but they had previously refused to sell their air rights, and these could no longer be transferred to nearby sites. The Guild building had been fully occupied as late as 1991, but it had since lost most of its tenants. CDL wanted to redevelop the Guild site with a 19-story hotel annex containing 130 rooms, and it offered to pay $80,000 for asbestos remediation of the site. The acquisition was finalized in May 1997; CDL announced it would spend $28 million on the annex, or $230,000 a room. The hotel was temporarily partially closed after an accident during the construction of 4 Times Square, one block south; the closure cost the hotel a quarter-million dollars per day.

The Millennium Premier annex opened in 1999. The original hotel was also renovated in the early 2000s. In the aftermath of the September 11 attacks in 2001, the hotel received more corporate tenants, though this could also be attributed in part to the renovation. CDL had requested a tax abatement for the construction of the Millennium Premier, arguing that it was part of the existing hotel because it did not have separate mechanical system and it was connected to the Hudson Theatre at several locations. The city initially denied the tax abatement, conceding the Premier annex was separate from the original hotel, and the New York Supreme Court upheld the decision. However, the ruling was overturned on appeal in 2003, and the city was forced to pay the abatement retroactively. In 2005, Jablonski Berkowitz Conservation restored the theater for $1.2 million.

In December 2015, the Ambassador Theatre Group signed a lease with Millennium & Copthorne to convert the Hudson Theatre back to a Broadway venue. The Hudson Theatre was reopened as a Broadway theater in February 2017. The hotel became affiliated with Hilton Hotels, under the Doubletree brand, starting in June 2019. It was rebranded as Millennium Times Square New York, a Doubletree by Hilton Hotel. At the end of the affiliation period, the Millennium Times Square was to become a Hilton hotel. The hotel briefly closed in early 2020 due to the COVID-19 pandemic in New York City but reopened in June 2020. In June 2021, Hilton abruptly ended its affiliation, and Millennium Hotels and Resorts hired Highgate to manage the hotel instead. The hotel's lobby and guestrooms were renovated in early 2026, reopening that June.

== Critical reception ==
In 1989, Paul Goldberger wrote for The New York Times that the Hotel Macklowe "stands as New York's proudest monument to the art of the deal." The following year, Goldberger wrote that the lobby "is a spectacular interior set within a mediocre new tower of dark green glass on a stone base that appears to have been designed for another building altogether", though the guest rooms were less impressive to him. Terry Trucco, a hotel critic for The New York Times, repeated the sentiment, saying: "The surprise is that this enormous 638-room hotel has an imposing sense of style". A Los Angeles Times review described the hotel as having "all the luxuries of the major chain hotels but none of the tackiness".

== See also ==
- List of hotels in New York City
