= Harry B. Macklowe =

American real-estate developer

- Born: 1937 (age 88–89)
- Occupation: Real estate investor
- Known for: Founder of Macklowe Properties
- Spouses: Linda Burg (m. 1959; div. 2018) Patricia Lazar-Landeau (m. 2019)
- Children: 2

Harry B. Macklowe (born 1937) is an American real estate developer and investor based in New York City.

== Early life ==
Macklowe was born to a Jewish family, the son of a garment executive from Westchester County, New York. He graduated from New Rochelle High School in 1955, and attended the University of Alabama, New York University, and the School of Visual Arts before dropping out, in 1960, to become a real estate broker. In 1959, he married Linda Burg, a doctor's daughter. She worked as an editorial assistant at Doubleday. Together, they moved into a garden apartment in Brooklyn, where Harry developed an interest in the landlord's brownstone-renovation business, and the landlord encouraged 21-year-old Harry, steering him into the job as a real estate broker.

== Career ==
Macklowe quickly transitioned from broker to builder. Keenly interested in architecture and modern art, he soon became known for developing sleek modernistic buildings such as Metropolitan Tower in Midtown Manhattan, as well as for his starkly white minimalist offices. His firm, Macklowe Properties, owns or has owned a number of New York buildings including 400 Madison Avenue, the Drake Hotel (which he demolished to make way for 432 Park Avenue), and Hotel Macklowe. In 1985, Macklowe was fined $2 million for demolishing four buildings in Times Square in the middle of the night.

In 2003, Macklowe bought the General Motors Building for a record $1.4 billion. The value of the skyscraper soon doubled after he persuaded Apple to build a subterranean Apple retail store beneath the building's plaza, an idea he personally and successfully pitched to Apple CEO Steve Jobs. Jobs then proposed that the entrance to the sunken store be a 32-foot tall-glass cube, which the city approved and was opened to the public in 2006.

In February 2007, during the peak of the real estate market, Macklowe purchased seven Manhattan skyscrapers for $6.8 billion from the Blackstone Group. He used $50 million of his own money and financed the rest with $7 billion in short-term loans (due in February 2008) from Deutsche Bank and the publicly traded hedge fund the Fortress Investment Group. In early 2008, he failed to refinance a $5.8 billion loan from Deutsche Bank, and lost all seven buildings. Among the buildings forfeited were the General Motors Building (which collateralized the loan) and the Credit Lyonnais Building.

In 2013, Macklowe and Steve Witkoff purchased the Park Lane Hotel on Central Park South in Manhattan for $660 million.

=== Criticism ===
Several Macklowe developments have received criticism when they were developed. For instance, when Metropolitan Tower was developed in the late 1980s, Paul Goldberger called it "the least respectful of the architectural traditions" in its vicinity, The comments about Metropolitan Tower in particular led Macklowe to express dissatisfaction at architectural criticism directed toward his buildings "just because I'm a developer and we do the architecture ourselves".

Several architectural critics, social media influencers, and journalists have commented on 432 Park Avenue's "ugly" design. After 432 Park Avenue was completed in the late 2010s, there were allegations of structural deficiencies, such as leaks and defective elevators, in the building. A proposed Macklowe Properties building, Tower Fifth, has similarly received backlash for its unattractive design; several critics claimed Macklowe was "ruining" the New York skyline.

== Personal life ==
On January 4, 1959, Macklowe married Linda Burg. After over 50 years of marriage in 2016, Burg filed for divorce. In 2019 after a contentious, $2 billion divorce, he remarried to Patricia Lazar-Landeau. Macklowe put a massive picture of himself and his new wife on the corner of 432 Park Avenue, in what was widely seen as an insult to his former wife.

Following the high-profile divorce, the pair's extensive collection of artwork from artists such as Alberto Giacometti, Mark Rothko and Cy Twombly was auctioned off by Sotheby's in two parts as part of a court order in November 2021. Estimated at a $600 million value, the first half of the collection sold for even more; at auction, it brought in $676 million. Sotheby's called it the most valuable single-owner auction ever conducted. On May 16, 2022, when Sotheby's held part two of the sale, the auction house hit what it called a record for a private art collection sold at auction, bringing the total to $922 million, with fees.

The Macklowes have two children: William S. Macklowe and Elizabeth Macklowe. William replaced his father as President of Macklowe Properties in 2008. He and his wife belong to the Jewish Center of the Hamptons synagogue. In 1993, William married and divorced the American fashion designer Tory Burch. In 2004, William married Julie Lerner in a Jewish ceremony at the Metropolitan Club in New York City. Elizabeth was married to and divorced from Kent Swig, son of fellow real estate developer Melvin Swig.
