= The Macklowe =

The Macklowe is an American brand of single malt whiskey created by entrepreneur Julie Macklowe. The whiskey is distilled in Kentucky and aged seven years. A limited run of 237 was produced from its first cask.

== Origins and Philosophy ==
During her early career, while traveling for her finance career, she made trips to Speyside, Paris, and Kentucky, searching out bottle shops and duty-free stands. She has since expanded her collection of whiskeys to over 1,000 bottles. As whiskey values began to explode in the mid 2010s, Macklowe zeroed in on an opportunity to create a single malt made in America.

== Production ==
Macklowe partnered with renowned Scottish distiller and blender Ian MacMillan, known for his work with Bunnahabhain and Bladnoch. The Macklowe is produced in Kentucky the way bourbon is traditionally made, using a column still and copper doubler. She chose to produce a single malt because of the versatility of barley, the base grain, and the wide range of flavors. The brand follows a farm-to-table philosophy, which includes a locally sourced malted barley. The first releases were made in Oregon to Macklowe's specifications and aged further in Kentucky, where the initial runs are made, matured, and bottled. Casks spend anywhere from 5–8 years in American white oak barrels before being hand selected by MacMillan. The product is then bottled in hand-crafted, hand painted bottles designed after flasks.

== Tasting Notes ==
With notes of vanilla and hazelnuts on the nose, The Macklowe’s Cask No. 61 is a silky, full-bodied affair marked by flavors of coffee and leather, and lingering spice.

The latest release of The Macklowe, Cask No. 60, has been observed to taste like cloves, citrus, vanilla, and brown sugar, with a pronounced oakiness; the nose is strong, the finish smooth, and the seven-year-old liquid registers as spicy and warm.

== Reception ==
Bloomberg called The Macklowe “the new whiskey that is taking over Wall Street.” The Macklowe has consistently sold out each limited release of its Casks of Distinction within minutes of becoming available. Chef Daniel Boulud praises its “balance and purity.” Jean-Georges’ restaurants, Eleven Madison Park and Daniel, the Polo Bar, and institutions like Marea, Catch Steak, Carbone, Le Pavillon, Le Bilboquet, Nick & Sam's Steakhouse,Casa Cipriani, Casa Lever, Lola Taverna, Bemelmans at the Carlyle, the Grill, the Lobster Club and Tutto il Giorno serve it. It is also available in Las Vegas at many high limit bars inside major casinos.
