= Norman Jaffe =

American architect (1932–1993)

- Norman Jaffe in front of his Bridgehampton Studio, 1993
- Born: April 3, 1932; Chicago, Illinois, US
- Died: August 19, 1993 (aged 61); Bridgehampton, New York, US
- Education: University of California, Berkeley, University of Illinois, Art Institute of Chicago, Art Students League of New York
- Occupation: Architect
- Spouse(s): Barbara Cochran Jaffe (died in 1965); Sarah Jaffe Turnbull
- Children: 3
- Website: normanjaffe.com

Norman Jaffe (April 3, 1932 – August 19, 1993) was an American architect widely noted for his contemporary residential architecture, and his "strikingly sculptural beach houses" for high-end clientele on Eastern Long Island in southeastern New York. He is credited with pioneering the "design of rustic Modernist houses in the Hamptons", and with being an innovator in using natural materials and passive solar forms of design, and urban design.

== Biography ==
Norman Jaffe was born in 1932 in Chicago to poor immigrant parents from Poland and Latvia. During the period of the depression, he was sent to live with relatives in Seattle where he attended high school. After finishing school, he joined the military in 1954, serving with the United States Army Corps of Engineers in Japan during the Korean War.

In 1956, Jaffe finished his military service and returned to the United States. He began studying architecture at the University of Illinois at Urbana–Champaign, later transferring to the University of California, Berkeley where he received his bachelor's degree in 1958. Jaffe went on to complete study at Art Students League of New York and Art Institute of Chicago. While at Berkeley, Jaffe studied under noted residential architects William Wurster and Joseph Esherick who co-founded the College of Environmental Design at the University of California, Berkeley. After receiving his degree, Jaffe began working for Esherick and in 1961, he left his wife and son and moved to New York to work for Skidmore, Owings & Merrill, one of the largest architectural firms in the world, and later, for Philip Johnson.

In 1965, Jaffe's estranged wife, Barbara Cochran, was living in Glen Ellyn, Illinois with their 7-year-old son Miles and her parents when she was killed in a motor vehicle accident. Miles moved to New York to live with his father.

Jaffe had begun visiting Long Island in the 1960s, and in 1973 he moved to Bridgehampton where he opened an architectural practice. He became the most prolific architect in the Hamptons at that time, designing more than 50 local houses, from small summer homes to large estates. His work in the Hamptons included a golf club, synagogue and restaurant. The New York Chapter of the American Institute of Architects gave Jaffe an award in 1977 for a beach house he designed on Long Island. Jaffe and Emery Roth & Sons were the architects of the Guardian Life Building, built in the Financial District in 1983.

In 1985, Jaffe met Sarah Stahl at a Hampton Jitney bus stop. They were married in 1986 and had two sons.

In 1987, Jaffe donated his services to the Jewish Center of the Hamptons and designed their Gates of the Grove synagogue, described as Jaffe's "masterpiece...(with) a remarkable blend of material and spiritual substance", and "one of the finest examples of modern synagogue design in America". Jaffe's design won awards for contemporary religious design. Paul Goldberger, a Pulitzer Prize-winning architecture writer from The New Yorker, later described the Gates of the Grove as Jaffe's "greatest work" and a "truly sacred space...", and architecture historian Alastair Gordon said Jaffe's design for the Gates of the Grove "was the jewel in the crown of his turbulent career".

Jaffe was inducted as a fellow of the American Institute of Architects in 1991; the Smithsonian Institution honored the occasion by exhibiting his work. It was reported he was "commanding design fees of as much as half a million dollars."

One of Jaffe's final designs was the office building at 565 Fifth Avenue, Manhattan. It was finished in 1993. Architecture critic Paul Goldberger from The New Yorker, described the building as "quite remarkable...a stunning modernist object (which) respects the street, and in so doing, it enriches the city."

Jaffe assisted a number of charities, including medical relief programs in East Africa and local charities on Long Island. He also donated his professional services to charities and completed a design for a children's hospital in Croatia.

== Death ==
Early in the morning of August 19, 1993, Jaffe disappeared while swimming off a beach in Bridgehampton, New York, where he was known to often swim alone. His clothes and other personal items were found unattended on the beach. He had only learned to swim in his 50s, and his friends and family were reported as saying he was an overconfident but poor swimmer. A month later, fishermen found a human pelvic bone on the beach near where Jaffe disappeared. A humerus was also found on a beach in East Hampton, several miles away. The Suffolk County, New York, Medical examiner used medical records and x-rays to confirm the remains belonged to Jaffe. His death was presumed to be an accidental drowning. On September 24, 1993, he was buried at Shaare Pardes Accabonac Grove Cemetery, a Jewish cemetery. Norman Jaffe was survived by his wife, Sarah Jaffe Turnbull, and three sons.

== Legacy ==
During his 35-year career as an architect, Norman Jaffe built more than 600 projects and received numerous architecture awards. That comes out to one project every three weeks. His work was displayed in museums exhibitions around the United States and overseas, including at the Museum of Modern Art in New York. Between 1967 and his death in 1993 he designed more than 50 houses in the Hamptons.

From July 24 to September 18, 2005, the Parrish Art Museum in Southampton, New York, presented "Romantic Modernist: The Life and Work of Norman Jaffe, Architect", the first major exhibition examining Jaffe's life and work. The curator of the exhibition was architectural historian Alastair Gordon, who is also the author of the book, Romantic Modernist: The Life and Work of Norman Jaffe Architect 1932-1993. The exhibition included architectural sketches and models, plans, photographs, furniture and a short documentary film featuring Paul Goldberger, architecture critic from The New Yorker, and archive footage of Jaffe himself.

On December 18, 2008, the Avery Architectural and Fine Arts Library at Columbia University in New York announced it had acquired Jaffe's architectural archives. The collection includes architectural drawings, presentations and photographs from Jaffe's professional practice and covers more than 80 projects from the 1960s to the 1990s.

== Publications ==
- Gordon, Alastair, Romantic Modernist: The Life and Work of Norman Jaffe Architect 1932-1993, Monacelli, July 21, 2005, ISBN 978-1-58093-156-4
