= Millennium & Copthorne Hotels =

Hospitality management and real estate group

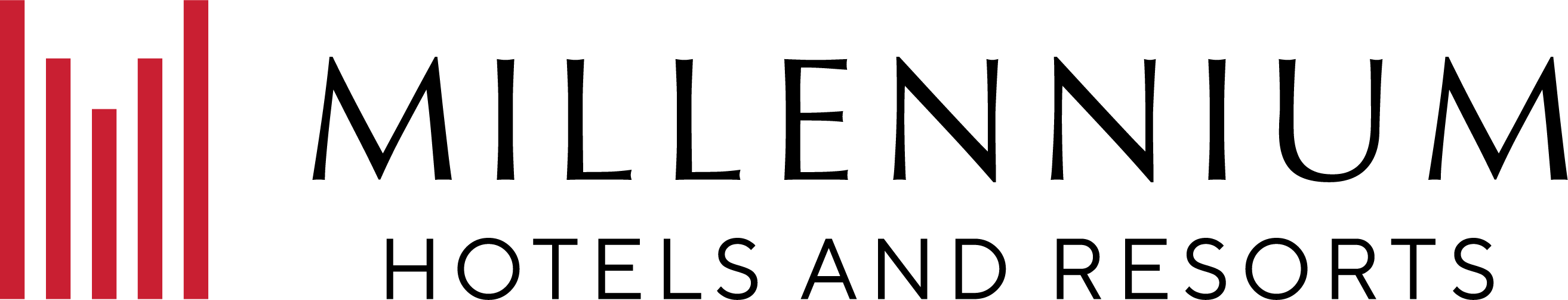
- Type: Subsidiary
- Industry: Hotels
- Headquarters: Singapore, London
- Key people: Kwek Leng Beng (chairman)
- Revenue: £997 million (2018)
- Operating income: £105 million (2018)
- Net income: £93 million (2018)
- Parent: City Developments Limited
- Website: millenniumhotels.com

Millennium Hotels and Resorts (MHR) is a Singapore-based global hospitality company, acquired by City Developments Limited.

Millennium Hotels and Resorts (MHR) operates a diverse portfolio of hotel brands, including The Biltmore, Leng's Collection, Copthorne, Kingsgate, Grand Millennium, Millennium, M Social, Studio M, and M Hotel. The company is headquartered in both Singapore and London, with regional offices supporting its international operations.

== History ==
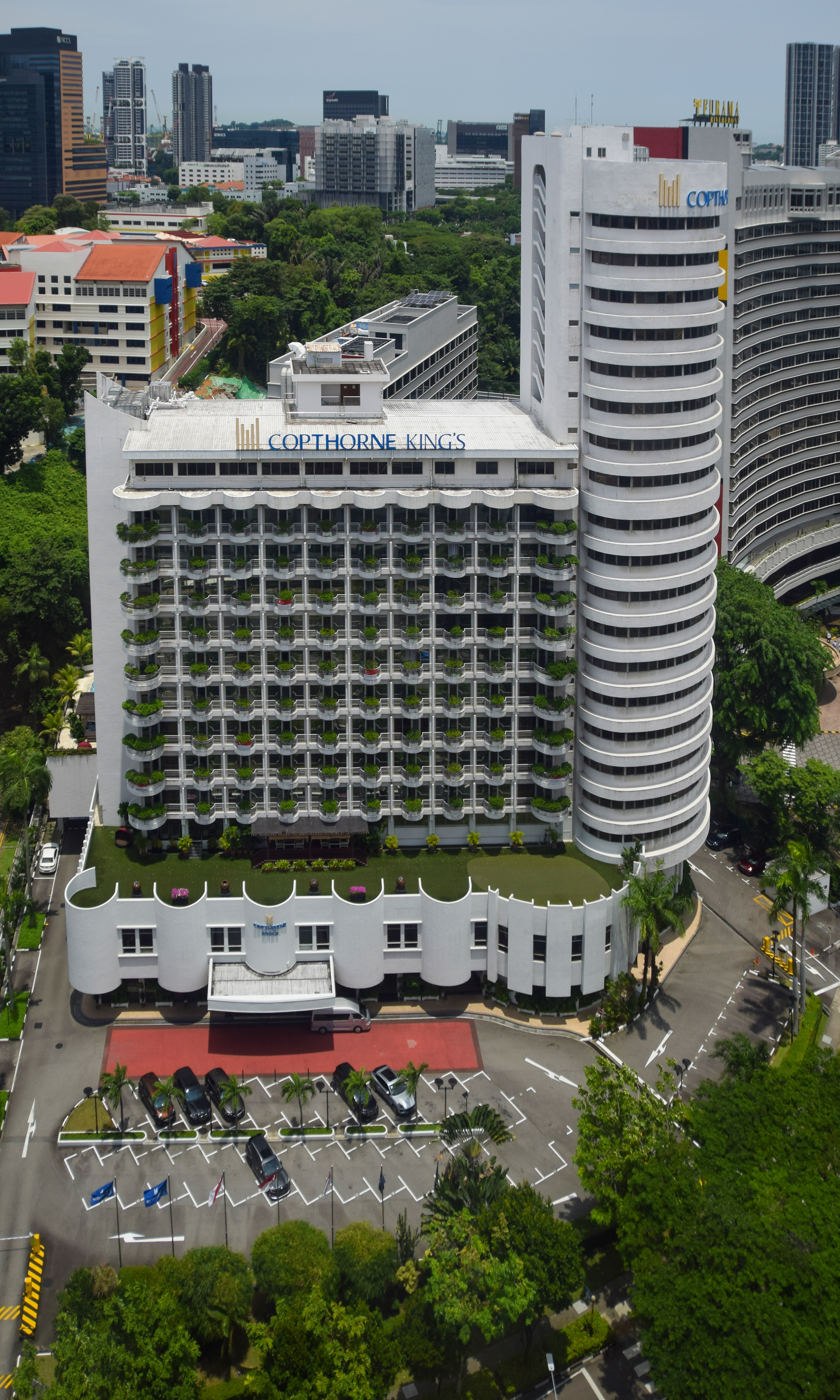
Copthorne King's Hotel in Singapore

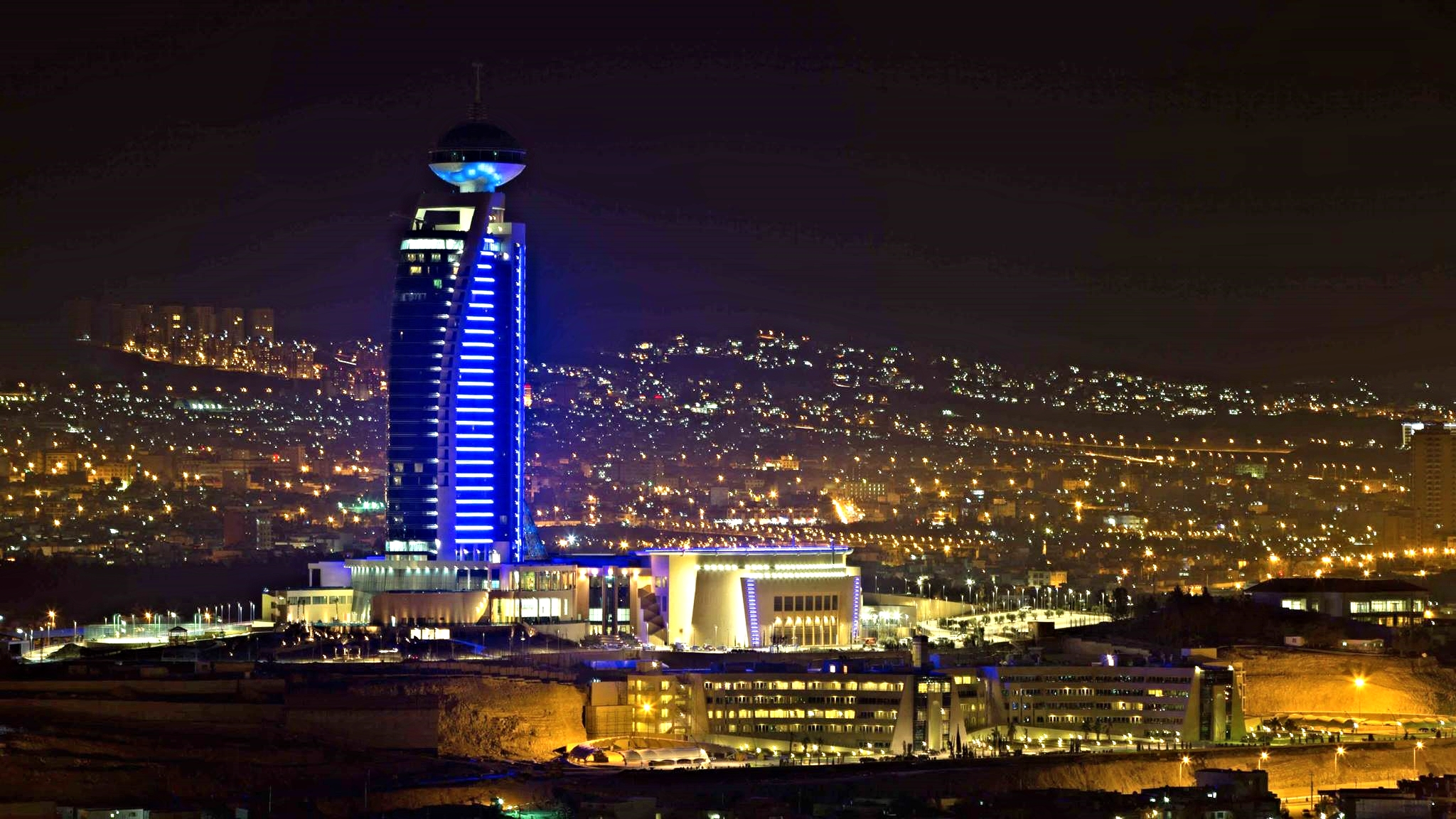
Grand Millennium Hotel in Sulaymaniyah

The company traces its origins to the Hong Leong Group, founded by Kwek Hong Png in 1941. The group's entry into the hospitality industry began in 1970 with the opening of King's Hotel in Singapore, now known as Copthorne King's Hotel. In 1972, Hong Leong Group acquired a controlling interest in City Developments Limited (CDL), which went on to establish Millennium Hotels and Resorts in 1995, following CDL's acquisition of the Copthorne Hotels chain.

In 1989, CDL Hotels International, which now owned six hotels in Asia, was listed on the Hong Kong Stock Exchange. In 1993, CDL made its first move outside Asia, purchasing the 548-room Gloucester Hotel and The Bailey's Hotel, both in London. In the same year CDL took control of a 13-hotel chain in New Zealand. It also started constructing The Heritage Hotel in Pasay City, Metro Manila, Philippines on the same year.

In 1994, CDL entered the US market, purchasing The Millennium Hilton and the Macklowe Hotel, both in New York.

In 1995, CDL Hotels acquired the Copthorne Hotels consisting of the Novotel Orchid Inn, the King's Hotel and the Harbour View Hotel, for £219 million. British Caledonian Airways had acquired the Copthorne Hotel at Copthorne, West Sussex, near Gatwick in 1972 and later launched the Copthorne Hotels brand in 1985. The three Copthorne Hotels owned by CDL Hotels were renamed the Copthorne Orchid Hotel, the Copthorne King's Hotel and Copthorne Harbour View Hotel respectively.

CDL merged the two chains into Millennium & Copthorne Hotels. In 1996, the chain was listed on the London Stock Exchange.

In 1999, the company acquired the 17-property Regal Hotels chain in the United States and in 2001 it expanded into the Middle East with several management contracts secured in the United Arab Emirates. In 2006 the chain expanded to China, and opened the first of six more hotels in China in 2008.

In 2015, the group announced four new hotels to open in Dubai. Still in 2015, the group's financial results slightly declined due to troubled events affecting tourism worldwide which led to the resignation of its CEO Aloysius Lee. Tan Kian Seng began serving as the interim CEO after Jennifer Fox stepped down as the group's CEO in September 2018, just three months after her appointment.

In 2019, CDL, which owned a controlling 62.5% stake in Millennium & Copthorne Hotels, bought back the remaining shares for £776.29 million and de-listed the company from the London Stock Exchange.

Clarence Tan was appointed CEO of Millennium and Copthorne Hotels in March 2020, and left the role in July 2020 four months after his appointment.

In May 2020, Millennium & Copthorne announced 910 job losses from its 20 hotels in New Zealand as a result of the COVID-19 pandemic. In reaction to the COVID-19 pandemic, Millennium and Copthorne Hotels created the We Clean We Care We Welcome Global Safety Commitment.

In March 2025, Catherine Wu resigned as an unpaid adviser to Millennium & Copthorne Hotels with immediate effect. During a boardroom dispute, the CEO of City Developments Limited, Sherman Kwek, claimed that she had wielded "huge influence" in matters "beyond her scope".

== Ownership ==
In June 2019 the company's board agreed to recommend a takeover offer, valuing the business at £2.23 billion, from City Developments Limited for the shares it does not already own. The transaction became unconditional in September 2019.
