= Copthorne Orchid Hotel =

Hotel in Singapore

Coordinates: 1.323°N 103.823°E

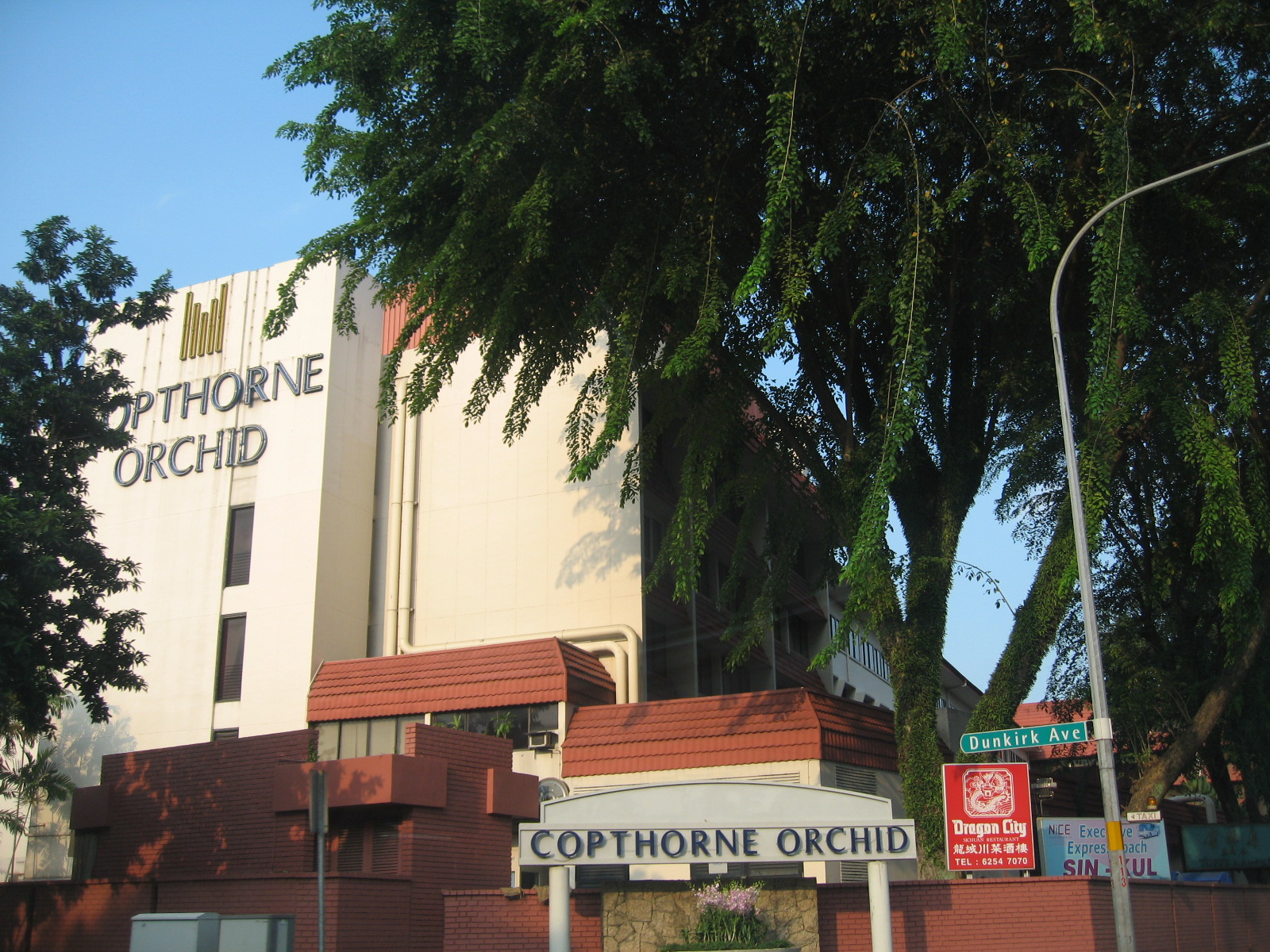
The hotel in 2006

Copthorne Orchid Hotel was a hotel at the corner of Dunearn Road and Dunkirk Avenue in Singapore. Opened as the Orchid Inn in 1970, it was renamed the Novotel Orchid Inn in 1972. In 1998, it was renamed the Copthorne Orchid Hotel when the hotel's owners, City Developments Limited, acquired the Copthorne chain of hotels. It was demolished in April 2011 to make way for a condominium.

== History ==
The Orchid Inn was officially opened in July 1970, catering to expatriates working in Singapore. It housed the Vanda Bar, as well as the Topps Lounge, where prominent local singers such as Huang Qing Yuan and Wang Li performed. By October, there were plans for a $1.5 million expansion, which would introduce a tropical garden theme as well as two restaurants, with one serving Japanese cuisine and the other serving Malay cuisine. 150 solar panels were installed on the hotel's roof in 1980, making it the first hotel in Singapore to be solar-powered. On 1 August 1982, it was renamed the Novotel Orchid Inn following the signing of a contract between French hotel chain Novotel and the hotel's owners City Developments Limited. In the same year, it underwent an expansion which added 158 more guest rooms, which brought the total number of guest rooms in the hotel to 479. In November, an additional 192 solar panels were installed on the hotel's roof, which made it one of the hotels with the largest solar power system in Southeast Asia. By then, the only other hotel in Singapore to have installed a solar power system was the King's Hotel, which was also owned by City Developments Limited. The hotel reportedly saved $10,000 a month through using solar panels to provide electricity instead of a boiler. An extension which added 155 guest rooms and three function rooms was completed in 1984. In March of the same year, the hotel signed a collective agreement with the Food, Drinks & Allied Workers Union. In August, the Austrian restaurant Winnerwald, which was housed in the hotel's old wing, was replaced by Le Pescadou, a French seafood restaurant. The latter establishment received a positive review from Margaret Chan of The Straits Times in February 1986.

In 1988, the hotel underwent a $3 million facelift which extended the Moby Dick coffeehouse, converted six guest rooms into three meeting or function rooms and refurbished 100 guest rooms in the hotel's main wing. The hotel's garden and swimming pool areas were also landscaped. The facelift was done in stages, with work on the guest rooms in the main wing beginning in March and completing in June, the conversion of guest rooms to meeting rooms completing in February, and the extension of the coffeehouse occurring from April to June. In January 1989, Cheers! The Music Pub opened in the hotel. The pub's waiting staff were required to sing and dance. The staff performances were removed in early 1991, but they were returned later that year. On 1 February 1990, the hotel installed double-decker beds in family rooms.

In 1998, the hotel was renamed the Copthorne Orchid Hotel, following City Developments Limited's acquisition of the Copthorne hotel chain. The group's two other hotels in Singapore, the King's Hotel and the Harbour View Dai-Ichi Hotel, were also renamed the Copthorne King's Hotel and Copthorne Harbour View Hotel respectively. In May of the following year, Kwek Leng Beng, the executive chairman of the Hong Leong Group, which owns City Developments Limited, denied that there were any plans to redevelop the hotel into a condominium. In June 2005, City Developments Limited was successful in seeking approval from the government to redevelop the hotel into a condominium. However, the plans were not finalised. By then, its tenants had included the Charming Garden restaurant and the Dragon City Sichuan Restaurant. In February 2010, City Developments Limited announced that the hotel would be demolished and replaced with a condominium. At the time of the announcement, it housed the Palm's Asian Brasserie, which served Peranakan cuisine, the Topps Lounge and the Heritage – The North Indian Cuisine restaurant, which had opened in September of last year. Among its tenants were the Anne Salon and the Nice Express, an express bus service. However, in October, it was announced that the hotel's closure had been delayed, and that bookings would continue to be taken until 31 March of the next year. The hotel closed on 1 April 2011. It was then demolished to make way for The Glyndebourne, a 150-unit luxury condominium named after the Glyndebourne opera house in East Sussex, England.
