= Tower Fifth =

Proposed skyscraper in Manhattan, New York

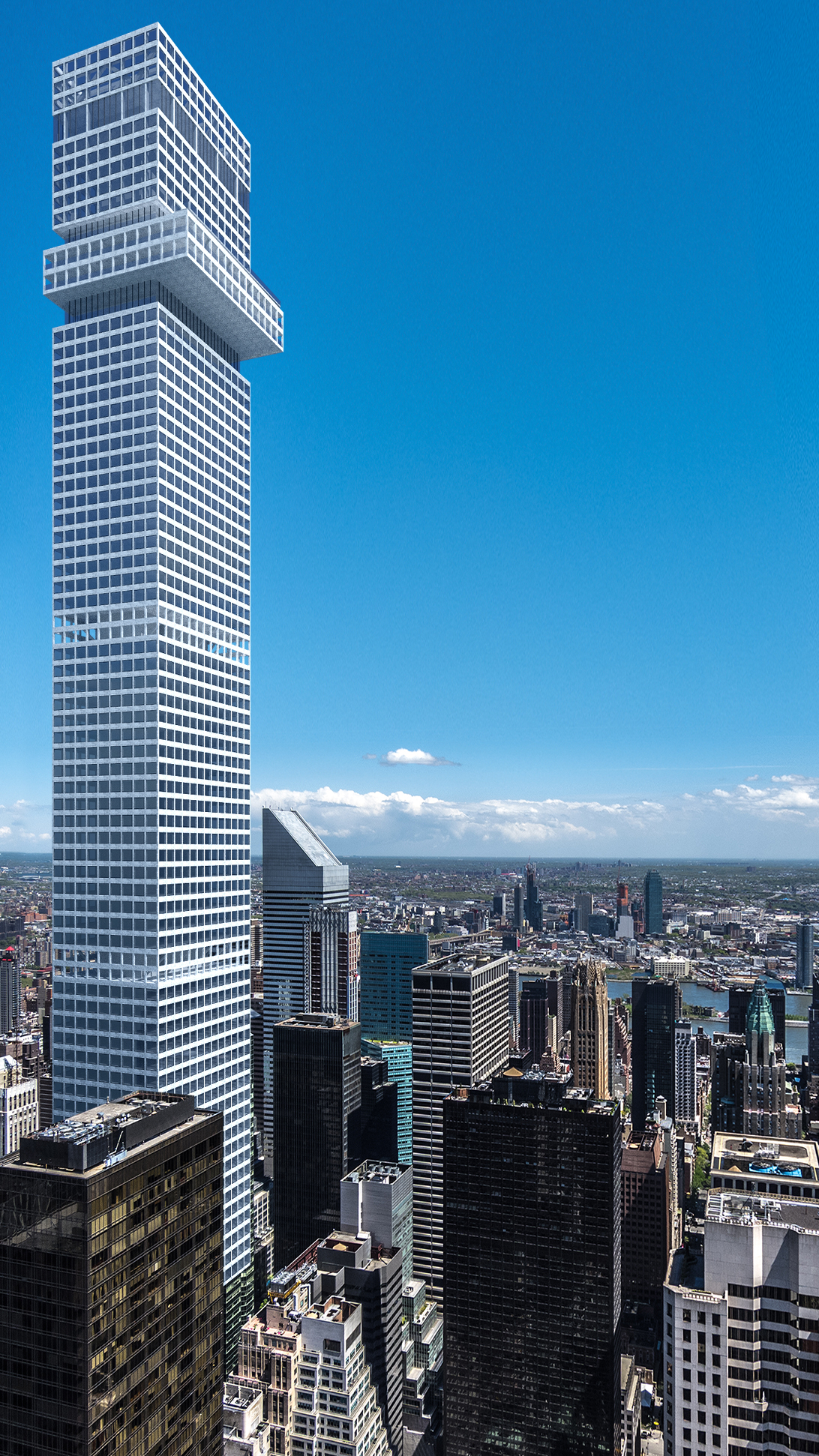
- Artist's impression
- Interactive map of the Tower Fifth area

General information
- Status: Proposed
- Type: Office
- Location: Manhattan, New York City, United States, 5 East 51st Street
- Coordinates: 40°45′32.5″N 73°58′33″W
- Construction started: Unknown
- Estimated completion: Unknown

Height
- Height: 1,556 feet (474 m)

Technical details
- Floor count: 96

Design and construction
- Architect: Gensler
- Developer: Harry B. Macklowe of Macklowe Properties

Tower Fifth is a skyscraper proposed for Midtown Manhattan in New York City. The developer, Macklowe Properties, has completed other projects including the redevelopment of the General Motors Building and construction of 432 Park Avenue. Plans for the structure were first revealed in January 2019, and the developer continued purchasing buildings to create an assemblage in 2019, closing on a building in March 2020, and continuing to eye buildings in June 2020. Demolition permits were first filed in April 2020.

It will be 1,556 feet (474 m) tall. If completed as planned, it will become the fifteenth tallest building in the world and the tallest in New York City by roof height, surpassing the nearby Central Park Tower by about 6 ft (2 meters).

In April 2025, Macklowe sold part of the proposed Tower Fifth site at 12 East 52nd Street for $15 million.

== Facade ==
The facade of Tower Fifth is designed by Gensler and would feature a closed cavity system that reduces solar heat gain by 70 percent. The massing of the structure is consistent for the bulk of the rise until it reaches a cantilevering observation deck consisting of multiple floors at the top.

== See also ==
- List of tallest buildings in New York City
- List of tallest buildings in the United States
- List of future tallest buildings
