= Seven Bar Foundation =

U.S. nonprofit organization

- The Seven Bar logo represents a "ladder", an exit strategy out of poverty for women.
- Founded: 2001
- Type: 501(c)(3)
- Purpose: Microfinance
- Location: New York, New York, United States
- Origins: Seven Bar
- Region served: World-wide
- Method: Cause marketing
- Key people: Renata M. Black
- Website: http://www.sevenbarfoundation.org

The Seven Bar Foundation is a social enterprise that uses cause marketing initiatives and the luxury lingerie industry to support microfinance. It is a 501(c)(3) nonprofit organization based out of New York, New York, that raises funds for microfinance institutions (MFIs) to help impoverished women start and expand their businesses.

== Model ==
The Seven Bar Foundation is a social enterprise, a nonprofit that uses business models for social impact. The Foundation relies on commercial markets for a consistent revenue stream in place of relying on donor funding, which may be more unpredictable and limited. Seven Bar uses the European lingerie industry as a marketing platform.

== History ==
Seven Bar is a third-generation family involved in general aviation, real estate development, and investments established in New Mexico beginning in the 1950's. Seven Bar along with Black family established the Seven Bar Foundation in 2001 with activities in eight states, contributing to community development projects in each.

=== Logo ===
The pink bars in Seven Bar Foundation's logo represent a "ladder" – an exit strategy out of poverty for women. The concept is based on the eighth step of Maimonides' Golden Ladder, "To prevent poverty by teaching a trade, setting up a person in business, or in some other way preventing the need of charity."

=== Renata M. Black ===
Renata Mutis Black has fought poverty in 12 different countries, working with terminally disabled children in Hong Kong, mentally disabled elders in New Zealand, and victims of the 2004 tsunami in India. The events of the 2004 tsunami centralized her vision toward microfinance.

== Events ==
=== Lingerie New York ===
Operating on the tagline "empowering women on a G-string rather than a shoestring," Lingerie New York was produced by fashion week regular Lynne O'Neill and showcased the latest collections of lingerie designers Atsuko Kudo and Carine Gilson. It was held in October 2010 at NYC's historic landmark Cipriani 42nd Street. Michelle Rodriguez DJed the event and supermodel Veronica Webb. Showcased a "space lace" corset made of injection-molded fiberglass. Designed by Dara Young. The event featured a performance by the Imaginaerial Entertainment Group. A cirque-style aerial silk act in which eight aerialists constructed a human Y. Also in attendance were host Sofia Vergara and media and fashion mogul Russell Simmons. Lingerie New York raised over $200,000 in the name of microfinance for women.

=== Lingerie Miami ===
Lingerie Miami took place in front of the Vizcaya Palace in Coral Gables, Florida, on February 7, 2009, showcasing European lingerie designers Agent Provocateur, Fifi Chachnil, and Carine Gilson. The event was hosted by Eva Longoria, co-hosted by Veronica Webb, DJed by Ève Salvail, and featured guest speaker Deepak Chopra. The event raised over $180,000, funding microloans for 2,233 women.

== See also ==
- Kiva (organization)
- Women's World Banking
- Opportunity International
