= Emma Priscilla Scott =

Canadian educator and author (1868–1940)

- Born: Emma Priscilla Scott; 1868; Hamilton, Ontario, Canada
- Died: 1940 (aged 71–72); Toronto, Ontario, Canada
- Occupations: Educator, author
- Spouse: William Bryant Raff (m. 1894) George Gallie Nasmith (m. 1940)
- Parents: Reverend James Scott; Elizabeth Cunningham

Emma Priscilla Scott (1868–1940) was an educator and author, born around 1868 in Waterdown (Hamilton), Ontario, daughter of the Reverend James Scott and Elizabeth Cunningham, both of Irish origin. She married William Bryant Raff on 6 June 1894 in Owen Sound, Ontario. They had one daughter, Dorothy Victoria. Raff died in 1897. She married George Gallie Nasmith, a bacteriologist with the Canadian Army Medical Corps, on 20 January 1916 in Toronto. They had no children. She died in Toronto on 16 February 1940.

== Career ==
She grew up in Owen Sound, where her father was a Methodist minister. She graduated from the collegiate institute there. After leaving school, she attended art classes in Toronto which were taught by George Agnew Reid. During the 1890s she ran an art studio in Owen Sound.

Her next move was to Colorado, where she met William Bryant Raff, a mining accountant who lived in Aspen and was born in Philadelphia. After her marriage, she used Scott Raff as her last name. She offered art classes in Aspen. The couple's daughter, Dorothy Victoria, was born in 1895. Her husband fell ill with pulmonary tuberculosis, so they moved to Arizona and then Owen Sound, where he died on 5 July 1897.

Her mother then looked after Dorothy Victoria in Owen Sound while Emma returned to Toronto. In 1899 she transferred to the Toronto College of Music and became assistant principal of its School of Elocution, Oratory, Physical Culture and Dramatic Art. After her graduation in 1900, she taught at the school. That autumn, she also became a teacher of physical training to women at Victoria College.

In 1909 she became a member of the Heliconian Club, which was founded as a women's version of the male-only Arts and Letters Club. This membership continued to the end of her life.

She started her own school in 1901. The subjects offered were voice culture, physical education, and literature. She also acted from 1902 to 1913 as director of physical education at Victoria's Annesley Hall and from 1903 to 1906, she was principal of the school of elocution at the Toronto College of Music. The subjects offered at her school included Shakespeare, Browning, elocution, drama, and physical training. The school's theatre performed plays from the Irish Literary Renaissance, and a play by Scott Raff, The message, formed part of the school's graduation exercises in June 1920. Despite seeking to attract well-to-do pupils, by 1924, the school had incurred debts of $39,000. The school's sponsor, Margaret Eaton, declined to pay further contributions, and Scott Raff resigned as principal. In 1925, the school was renamed the Margaret Eaton School (MES) in 1925. It was saved by Mary Grace Hamilton, the next principal. She transformed the school into a self-governing, self-financing school which taught physical training to women. It became part of the University of Toronto in 1941.

== Works ==
Published works by Emma Priscilla Scott (Raff; Nasmith) include two privately issued pamphlets, Of Queen’s Gardens (1914) and I’m going home (circa 1920), a memoir of her childhood. She also wrote The message (a play performed in 1920).
