= Andrew Ernemann =

American alpine skier

Andrew Ernemann (born April 20, 1976, in Aspen, Colorado) is a former alpine ski racer. He is now retired from international competition and lives in Aspen, Colorado. He is CEO of Aspen Snowmass Sotheby's International Realty in Aspen/Snowmass.

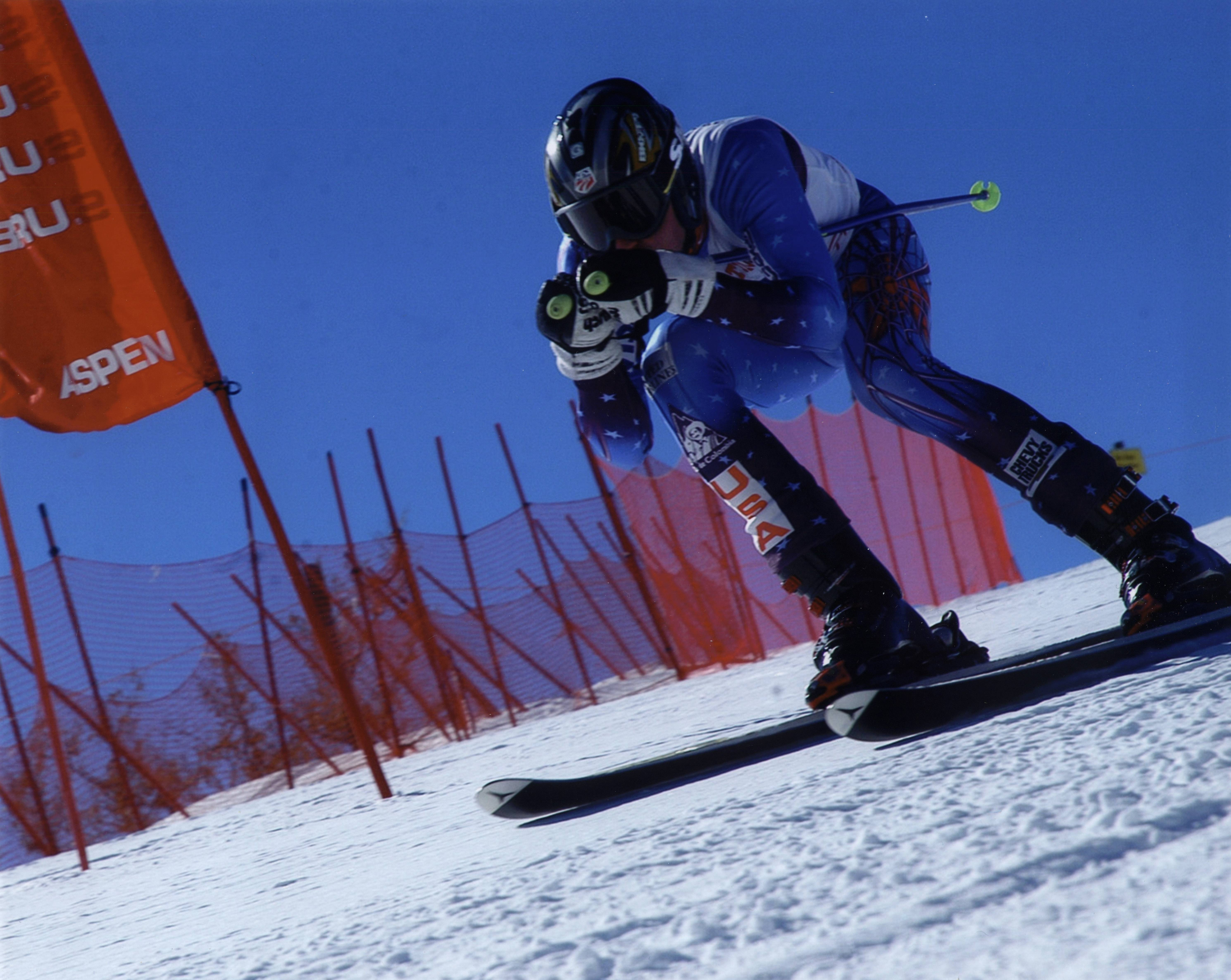
Andrew Ernemann

== Biography ==
Andrew Ernemann is a successful real estate entrepreneur with experience in real estate development, investments, real estate agency and real estate brokerage leadership and ownership. He is known for his in-depth real estate market reports covering the Aspen Snowmass, Colorado market area. Andrew's real estate insights and reports have been published by local, national and international publications.

Andrew won the Junior National Overall and Downhill titles in 1995, at the U.S. Alpine Championships in Snowbasin and Park City, Utah.

He competed as a member of the U.S. Alpine Ski Team during the 1997–98 season, following a number of years racing for various regional and national development squads. Ernemann competed all over North America, Europe and Australia.

Andrew Ernemann went on to graduate Phi Beta Kappa from the University of Colorado in 2000 with a degree in psychology.

After working for Janus Capital in Denver, Ernemann went on to receive a master's degree from Stanford University in 2003 (civil engineering - construction engineering and management).

Following his graduate studies, he was recruited by McKinsey & Company's Los Angeles office, where he worked from 2004 to 2005. Ernemann returned to Aspen in 2005 and works in the real estate sales, consulting and development field. He is often quoted in various media outlets for his real estate analytics and reports.

Andrew has served as president and CEO of Aspen Snowmass Sotheby's International Realty, and is a former president of the Aspen Board of Realtors. Andrew was awarded the top honor of Realtor of the Year in 2013 for the Aspen/Snowmass area.

He is married to Ashley Cockrill Ernemann (they both attended St. Paul's School in Concord, New Hampshire), and they have two sons, Tillar Haviland Ernemann and Cornell Frederich Ernemann.

== Career highlights ==
- 1995 U.S. Alpine Championships in Snowbasin and Park City, Utah: 14th in the downhill (gold medal for juniors)
- 1995 U.S. Alpine Championships in Snowbasin and Park City, Utah: gold medal, overall junior
- 1995 Rocky/Central Junior Olympics in Steamboat Springs, Colorado: gold medal in the downhill and overall
