= Robert R. Odén =

American physician (1922–2008)

- Born: December 2, 1922; Chicago, Illinois
- Died: May 18, 2008 (aged 85)
- Occupation: Orthopedist

Robert R. Odén (December 2, 1922 – May 18, 2008) was an American physician. Odén came to Aspen, Colorado, in 1957 and established in orthopedic medicine. He was the first, and for many years, the only orthopedic surgeon in the Aspen area. He was also the only board-certified orthopedist in a major ski area.

== Background ==
- Oden was born on December 2, 1922, in Chicago, Illinois, United States. Son of Rudolph J. E. and Olga H. (Wahlquist) Oden.

== Education ==
- Bachelor of Science, University Illinois, 1943. Doctor of Medicine, Northwestern University, 1947.
- Master of Science in anatomy, Northwestern University, 1947.

== Career highlights ==
- Intern, Augustana Hospital, Chicago, 1947-1948
- Resident in surgery, 1948-1949
- Resident in Orthopaedics Hines Veterans Hospital, 1949-1951
- Resident in children's Orthopaedics Shriner's Hospital, 1953-1954
- Private practice Chicago, 1954-1957
- Private practice Aspen, Colorado, from 1957 to his passing.
- Clinical Associate Professor Orthopedics University Colorado
- Medical advisor to the U.S. Olympic Committee from 1960 to 1980
- Orthopedic Surgeon United States Olympic Team, 1960, 72, 76, 80
- Founder, trustee Pitkin County Bank, from 1983

== Additional career information ==
In 1959 the U.S. Olympic Committee asked him to be the official team doctor for the United States Ski Team during the 1960 Winter Olympics in Squaw Valley, California. During that time, he discovered that the U.S. Ski Team did not have a medical pool to travel with and assist the team. Nor was there an American doctor with the team when they traveled to Europe.

Together with Willie Shaeffler and at his own expense, Odén began working to establish the U.S. Ski Team Doctor Pool. He recruited well-known sports medicine Orthopedists from around the country to travel with the team at all times. He also insisted that they pay their own way to Europe, or whenever traveling abroad.

Odén worked closely with Tagé Pederson, the ski team’s first trainer and together they established a basis of sports medicine for the skiing community. His deep interest and drive contributed to the development of quality sports medicine for all Olympic sports. In 1960, Dr. Odén organized the Aspen Boot Company. This company designed and manufactured the first, and until 1989, the only ski boot orthopedically designed to work with the human foot and ankle, thereby dramatically reducing the number of injuries sustained while skiing.

During the 1950s, Robert organized and led the fund raising drive to replace the 1890s Aspen Hospital. This new hospital provided modern and up to date medical facilities to the community. Then in the 1970s, history repeated itself when he worked to build the present and very modern Aspen Valley Hospital. This hospital is recognized as one of the finest 50-bed hospitals in the United States.

With the founding of Vail in 1962, Robert was asked by Pete Seibert to form a clinic in Vail similar to what he had established in Aspen and Snowmass to serve the skiing public. Over the next few years, he personally provided orthopedic service to that clinic, often traveling many miles per week to cover the western slope of Colorado. He was then a large force in raising money for the Medical Facility in Vail and was responsible for building the Vail Clinic, thus paving the way for Dr. Richard Steadman to move his clinic to Vail.

== Works ==
- Associate editor: Clinical Orthopedics and Related Research.

== Memberships ==
- Founder Aspen Institute Theological Futures, 1978
- Great Teachers and Preachers Series Episcopalian Church, 1989
- Trustee United States Ski Educational Foundation, 1967—1982
- Aspen Valley Hospital, 1978—1986
- Founder Aspen Orthopaedics and Sports Medicine Public Foundation, 1985
- Member organizing committee Aspen World Cup, 1976—1992
- Founder Aspen Pitkin Employee Housing, 1975
- Member of International Society of Orthopaedic Surgery and Traumatology, American College of Surgeons, International Knee Institute, International Society Knee, Anterior Cruciate Ligament Study Group, International Ski Safety Society, American Orthopaedics Society Sports Medicine (Hall of Fame 2004), Canada Orthopaedics Association, Rocky Mountain Traumatologic Society, American Association Bone & Joint Surgeons, Western Orthopaedics Association, International College Surgeons, American Academy Orthopaedics Surgeons, Phi Beta Kappa.

== Community service ==
Odén was a founder and served many years as a member of the United States Ski Education Foundation (U.S.S.E.F.). During that time, he was quite active on the Board. He instigated the U.S. Ski Team Educational Program. He also raised money and became very instrumental in the formation of policies and maturity of the U.S.S.E.F. and the U.S. Ski Team.

Odén also served many years as the U.S. representative to the F.I.S. Medical Committee. He has promoted many aspects of safety on racecourses at the F.I.S. and U.S.S.A. levels including the required use of certified helmets for downhill racing. During his time in practice, he was Chief of Medical Services for every World Cup event as well as many Nor-Ams and other downhills held in Aspen.

Locally, he served for many years as the medical advisor to the Aspen Ski Patrol. He also has made himself available to any coach in the Rocky Mountain Division who wished to learn sports medicine. He always has given his advice freely to all or any that asked. He established the Emergency Medical Technician (E.M.T.) program together with the University of Colorado under the American College of Surgeons. In addition, Odén has been the driving force in the establishment of The Aspen Foundation for Sports Medicine and Education as a research laboratory in Aspen. Aspen Valley Hospital built a multi million-dollar conference center and dedicated it to Odén in 2001.

== Awards ==
- Julius Blegen Award (1985)
- Halstead Trophy (1986)
- Aspen Hall of Fame (1995) together with his wife, Nancy Clow Odén
- Marquis Who's Who in America (1997)
- Who’s Who in the World (1997)
- Who’s Who in Medicine and Healthcare (1997)
- Sports Medicine Doctor of the Year (1998)
- Colorado Ski Hall of Fame (2002)
- U.S. National Ski Hall of Fame (2002)
