= Vbeauté =

vbeauté
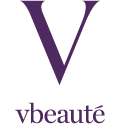
- Type: Cosmetics
- Industry: Personal care
- Founded: 2011
- Founder: Julie Macklowe
- Fate: Out of Business (2019)
- Products: Cosmetics; Skin Care
- Website: Official homepage

vbeauté was founded by Julie Macklowe to provide women with Swiss made anti-ageing skincare products. vbeauté is a skin care line based on advanced botanical technology using plant stem cell complexes. Macklowe launched vbeauté on November 1, 2011. vbeauté's range of products include: peptide-based anti-aging face and eye serums, moisturizers, eye cream, sunscreen, and a face cleanser and exfoliator. vbeauté’s key ingredient in all of their products is Swiss Alpine Rose, a cold-resistant plant from the Swiss Alps. Together, along with several other botanical ingredients, these plant extracts combine to form a complex compound which has anti-aging and protective properties. All vbeauté products are formulated in Switzerland, free of fragrance and parabens, and dermatologist and allergy tested.

== History ==
vbeauté was launched by investor and former hedge fund manager Julie Macklowe in 2011. During her travels, Macklowe could not find a suitable skincare product to meet her everyday needs. She then partnered with molecular scientists from the Centre de Recherches Biocosmétiques (CRB High Performance Care) of Geneva to formulate her products. By 2011, Macklowe had raised over $4,000,000 for lab work and testing. The skin care line's main ingredient contains stem cells from the Alpine Rose flower.

Macklowe launched vbeauté at a charity event coinciding with her 35th birthday. At the time of its launch in November 2011, the line was carried at 37 stores, some of which include: Neiman Marcus, Fred Segal, Nordstroms, and Bergdorf Goodman.

Initially, vbeauté was launched at Bergdorf Goodman's, a luxury goods department store based in New York City. After two years at Bergdorf's, the company appeared on the Home Shopping Network. vbeauté is the first luxury skincare line that took exactly the same products, ingredients, and packaging offered at higher price points at Bergdorf Goodman, and brought the same quality at more affordable pricing via HSN.

In 2019 the company went out of business.

== Products ==
The product was featured in O Magazine, which called it "a gorgeous way to keep jet lag at bay." In 2013, vbeauté expanded to be sold at Look Boutiques in Duane Reade and Walgreens stores in New York City, Los Angeles, and Miami. Macklowe's goal for the company is to provide lightweight and affordable skin care products, saying that, “When I think about all of the luxury lines out there, they feel like they were almost made for my mother. They’re heavy, and their price points were also of such. I want to keep everything really affordable.”

The vbeauté line offers a total of 8 products with 4 new products launching in 2016, as well as an extension to the line slated for 2017. The different types of products offered by vbeauté include: light anti-aging serum, exfoliant, foaming cleanser, moisturizer, peptide-based eye crème, and intense brightening treatment.

The products can be bought together as part of the "It Kit" or individually, in larger amounts. All of vbeauté’s products are fragrance free, dermatologist and allergy tested, and paraben free, due to Macklowe’s personal issues with sensitive skin.
