= Julie Macklowe =

American socialite and entrepreneur

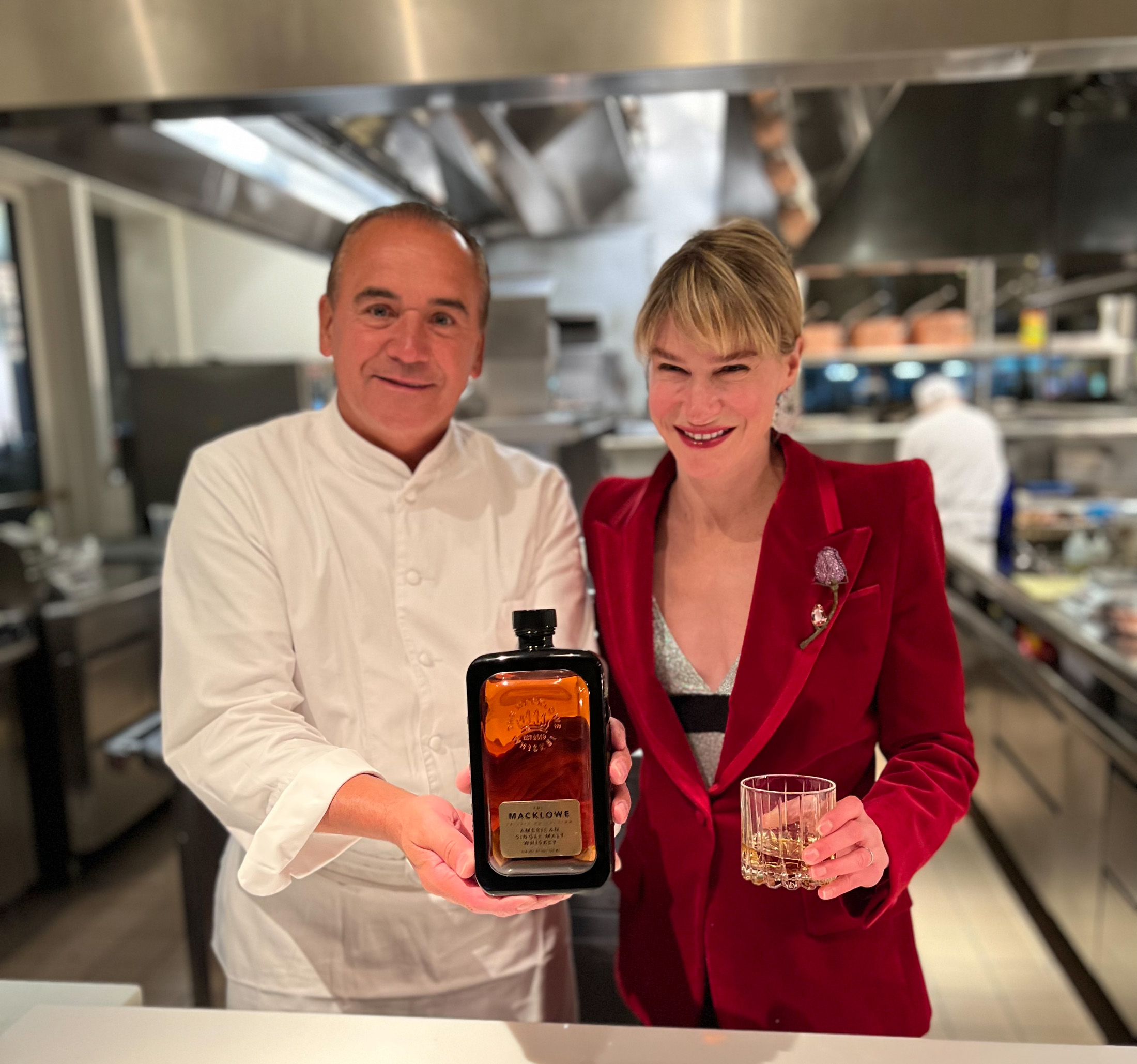
Julie Macklowe and chef Jean-Georges Vongerichten

Julie Macklowe (née Lerner, December 1977) is an American entrepreneur, political commentator, and philanthropist. She is married to Billy Macklowe, son of real-estate developer Harry B. Macklowe.

In 2021, she released The Macklowe, an American single malt whisky. She previously founded vbeauté, a former skincare line for women.

== Early life and education ==
Macklowe was born in Aspen and raised in Arizona, the daughter of Frank Lerner. She took over her grandfather's T-shirt company and transformed it into a women's sportswear company. She completed her B.A. in economics and B.S. in commerce, graduating magna cum laude from the University of Virginia McIntire School of Commerce in 1999. It was there that she received an early induction into New York finance circles while taking John Griffin's class.

== Career ==
In 2000, Macklowe worked with Chase Capital Management (now JPMorgan Partners) in Seoul and Hong Kong, where she helped structure leverage buyouts. Between 2003 and 2006, Macklowe was the managing director of Metropolitan Capital Management, and, in 2006, she joined the investment firm SAC, where she managed investment portfolios for Sigma Capital Management.

In 2009, backed by Millennium Partners, Macklowe opened her own $250 million hedge fund, Macklowe Asset Management. In October 2010, Macklowe closed the fund to pursue her own investments in fashion businesses. In an interview the following year, she said, "I haven’t looked at a stock since the day I left.”

=== BaubleBar ===
In 2010, Macklowe invested in BaubleBar, an online jewelry company. BaubleBar sells jewelry directly from suppliers and designers, bypassing bricks-and-mortar retailers. Macklowe helped the company in its initial fundraising efforts and currently sits on the company's board.

Macklowe was the muse for Zang Toi, for his Spring 2013 collection and debuted on the runway show September 9, 2012.

=== Vbeauté ===
Macklowe launched her own skincare company, Vbeauté on November 1, 2011. Vbeauté began as a luxury, travel-friendly toiletry kit. In 2011, the company raised $4 million and sold at 37 stores. In 2013, the product moved from Bergdorf Goodman to Walgreens, slashing all of its prices by over 50%. In September 2014, vbeauté launched a deal with the Home Shopping Network. Vbeauté went out of business in 2019.

=== The Macklowe ===
In December 2021, Macklowe launched The Macklowe, a single malt whiskey that is made in the United States. It is available online and at some New York bars and restaurants.

=== Political commentary ===
On May 22, 2026, Macklowe published an op-ed in The Wall Street Journal titled “A Wealthy New Yorker’s Case for the Pied-à-Terre Tax”, arguing that non-primary residents of NYC who own luxury second homes while paying zero state and city income tax should be subject to an annual surcharge. The New York State legislature passed the pied-à-terre tax On May 27. On May 29, she appeared on Fox Business to discuss the proposed tax. In June of 2026, Jacob Bernstein of The New York Times profiled Macklowe in a piece titled “The Pro-Tax Socialite”, examining her stance on wealth, civic obligation, and the departure of wealthy New Yorkers to Florida following the Covid-19 Pandemic.

== Personal life ==
In 2004, Julie married Billy Macklowe, son of Harry B. Macklowe, and founder of the William Macklowe Company. The couple lives in Manhattan and Long Island with their daughters. In addition to their residence in New York City, the couple owns houses in both Aspen and the Hamptons.

In 2008, Macklowe was named Vogue magazine's "It Girl".

In 2011, Macklowe hosted her 34th birthday party, which also featured the launch of her new vBeauté skin care line. The event was part of a cooperative effort to raise money for VH1's Save the Music Foundation.

In December 2022, Macklowe's 45th birthday party made headlines for its high-profile 600-person guest list and risqué dress code of "leather and lingerie". The party, its guests, and fashion were featured in New York Magazine.

Macklowe has been photographed at various social and philanthropic events wearing a range of designers including Dolce & Gabbana, Calvin Klein, Balenciaga and Oscar de la Renta. She has attended events such as the Couture Council and New Yorkers for Children fall gala. Macklowe also collects ball gowns, some of which have been showcased in the Alexander McQueen: Savage Beauty art exhibition at The Metropolitan Museum of Art.

== Philanthropy and other activities ==
Macklowe is a former board member of VH1’s Save the Music Foundation. In 2015, she and her husband hosted the foundation’s annual benefit in the Hamptons; the concert raised nearly $800,000.

Macklowe was involved with the Seven Bar Foundation, a non-profit which provided microfinance for impoverished women in 2015 and 2016. She has served on the Friends Committee for New Yorkers for Children, a non-profit which focuses on the academic success of foster children.

In 2011, she donated four gowns to the Costume Institute at the Metropolitan Museum of Art.

After Hurricane Sandy hit New York, Macklowe and her family apparently offered to take refugees into their Upper East Side home.

Macklowe previously sat on the advisory board of the University of Virginia McIntire School of Commerce. She is a founding advisory board member for Fashion Week at Lincoln Center. She previously served as Chairwoman of the Fashion Institute of Technology's Couture Council, and co-chaired the 2015 Couture Council Luncheon.
