= Jewish Center of the Hamptons =

Synagogue in East Hampton, New York, US

Jewish Center of the Hamptons (Gates of the Grove)
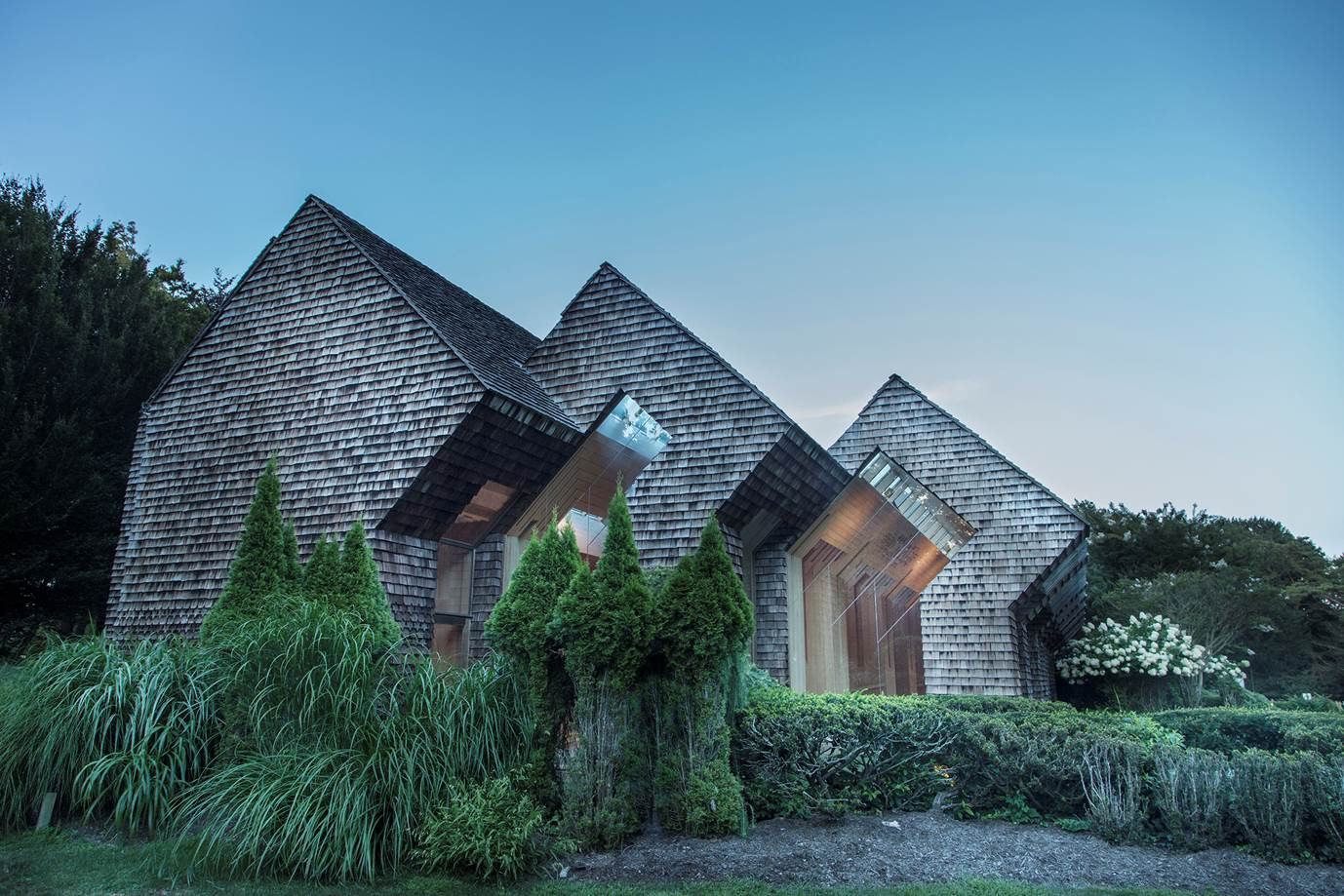
- The cedar–shingled exterior of the synagogue, in 2017

- Location in the Hamptons, on Long Island, New York

Religion
- Affiliation: Judaism
- Rite: Post-denominational
- Ecclesiastical or organizational status: Synagogue and community center
- Leadership: Rabbi Josh Franklin
- Status: Active

Location
- Location: 44 Woods Lane, East Hampton, Long Island, New York 11937
- Country: United States
- Interactive map of Jewish Center of the Hamptons (Gates of the Grove)
- Coordinates: 40°57′15″N 72°11′53″W

Architecture
- Architect: Norman Jaffe
- Type: Synagogue architecture
- Style: Modernist
- Funded by: Evan Frankel (gift of land)
- General contractor: Dave Webb, Inc.
- Established: 1959 (as a congregation)
- Completed: 1988

Specifications
- Site area: 2 acres (0.81 ha)
- Materials: Cedar shingles; wooden interior

Website
- jcoh.org

The Jewish Center of the Hamptons, abbreviated as JCOH, also called Shaarey Pardes (transliterated from Hebrew as the "Gates of the Grove"), is a post-denominational Jewish congregation, synagogue, and community center, located at 44 Woods Lane, in East Hampton, Long Island, in New York, in the United States.

Designed by Norman Jaffe in the Modernist style and dedicated on August 26, 1988, the synagogue has been called a masterpiece. The cedar–shingled synagogue building was awarded the Interfaith Forum on Religion, Art, and Architecture excellence in design award. Jaffe called on Kabbalistic symbolism, the famed light of the Hamptons, and local vernacular traditions to create a contemporary religious space that uses architecture to shape spiritual experience. The New York Times architecture critic Paul Goldberger described it as "a building that is at once a gentle tent and a powerful monument, at once a civic presence that celebrates community and a place of quiet meditation that honors solitude".

== History and use ==
The Jewish Center of the Hamptons was founded in 1959 when 23 individuals living in the East Hampton area began meeting for services in their own homes. As the congregation grew and migrated to various borrowed facilities, the need for their own permanent facility became clear. Land was acquired and, largely through the efforts of local financier Evan Frankel, funds were raised to construct a facility.

In 1983, Frankel met with Jaffe to discuss the project. Jaffe eagerly pursued the commission and, although he encountered some resistance from the board of directors, he eventually was chosen to design the new sanctuary when he offered his services pro bono.

Jaffe initially imagined Gates of the Grove as a tent in the woods — an elemental structure consisting of little more than a canopy roof. He quickly realized that he would need to adapt this vision to the needs of the congregation and the board and looked to wooden synagogues of Eastern Europe for inspiration. His final design, approved in 1984, continued the east–west longitudinal axis of the existing structure on the property via a new volume attached to its west end. Despite the complexity of his solution, he'd managed to preserve the essence of the original idea—the luminescent feeling of a tent softly lit by the sun—through an array of bent porticos separated by skylights.

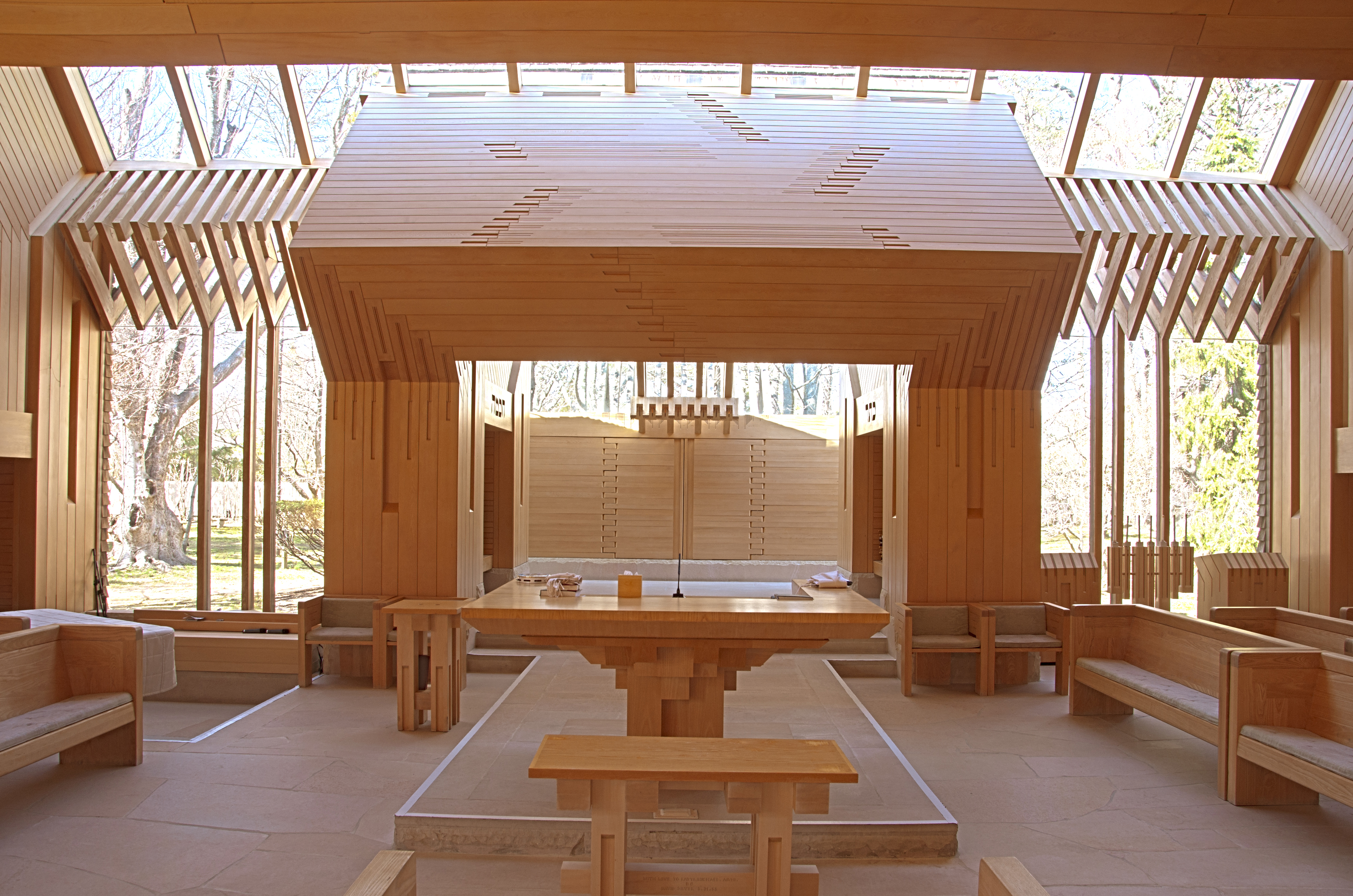
The Gates of the Grove, in 2016

Jaffe made many design decisions on site. He also engaged tradespeople and encouraged them to contribute to the creative development of the project. Randy Rosenthal, a painter and carpenter, co-designed and hand-carved extensive wood detailing, including the doors. Dennis Lawrence, a woodworker, developed a unique hinge for the ark.

At completion, expenses totaled nearly $2 million. The building was dedicated on August 26, 1988. New York Attorney General Robert Abrams presided over the ceremony, attended by four hundred people. Members of the local government and clergy attended as a gesture of public support. East Hampton Town Supervisor Judith Hope later featured Evan Frankel in her column in the East Hampton Star, writing, “By his personal example he proved that sensitive development, development that respected the delicate integrity of nature, was viable.”

Though JCOH uses tents for high holiday services—–the congregation is now 400 families–—the facility remains largely as Jaffe had intended. The Gates of the Grove continues to hold weekly Shabbat services year-round every Friday night and Saturday morning. From Memorial Day to Labor Day, the Jewish Center of the Hamptons hosts Shabbat on the Beach on Fridays with hundreds of people in attendance.

As of January 2024, Rabbi Joshua Franklin and Cantor Debra Stein served as clergy of the Jewish Center of the Hamptons.

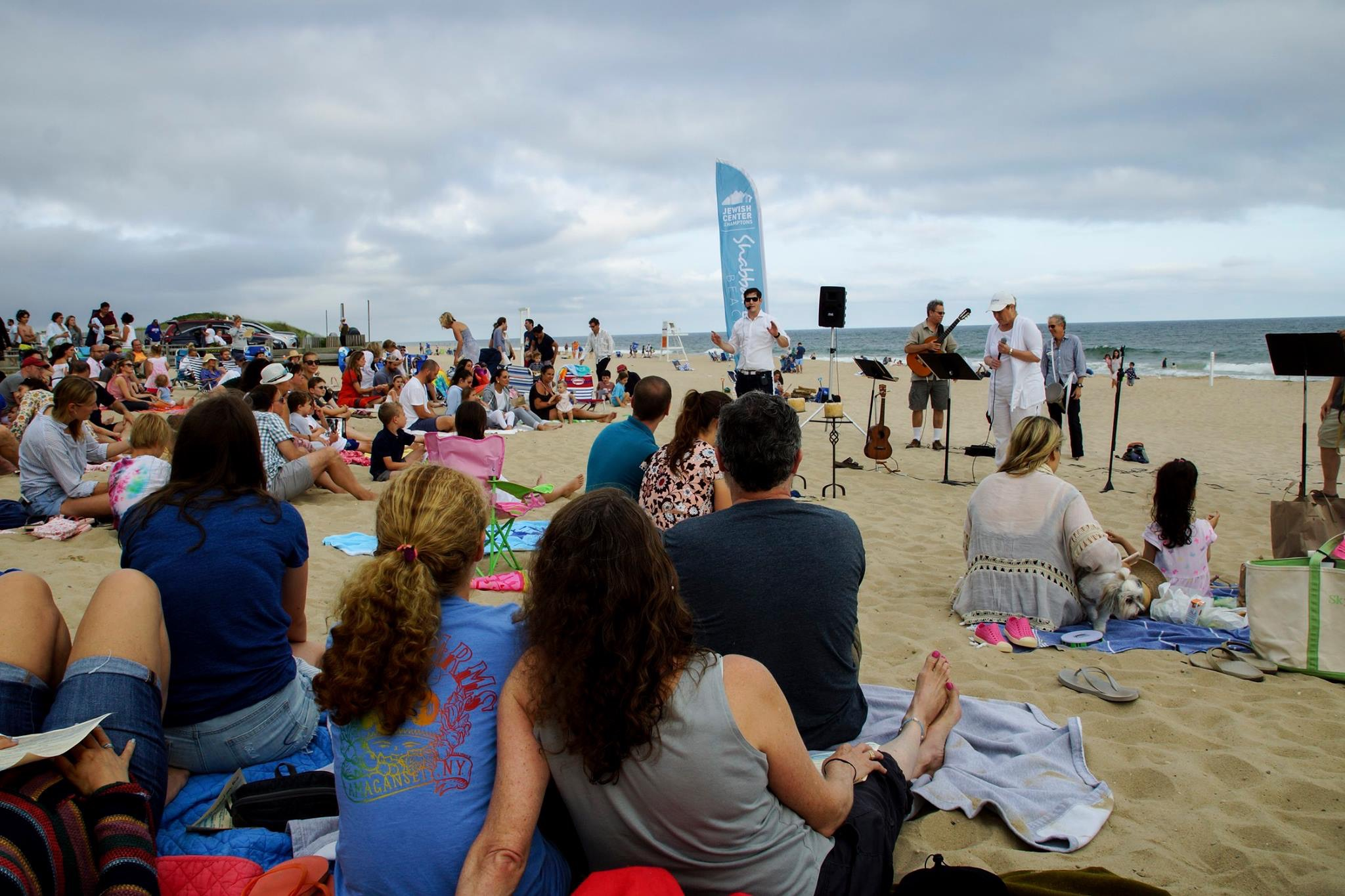
Shabbat on the Beach

=== Site and context ===
Jaffe made his first trip to the Hamptons in the 1960s. “Arriving for the first time, I was taken with the flat, green, pool-table, horizontal character of the landscape,” he said. “The sky came down dramatically.” He initially stayed with friends for weekend visits but as his commissions in the Hamptons increased, the gravitational pull of the East End increased. In 1973, he moved his practice to Bridgehampton.

Jaffe once said, “The site is at once the base, the foreground, and the background." At the Jewish Center, he manipulates the multiplicity of this definition in a structure that is both formally interesting and completely integrated into the site and greater context. Set back from the street and tucked behind the style of privet hedge favored by Hamptons’ estate owners, the synagogue is at once visible but not tangible. Jaffe used mature trees at the north end of the relatively flat property as a leafy backdrop for Gates of the Grove. In the foreground, a grass lawn extends from Woods Lane to the south elevation. From the road the façade is manifest but from the parking area at the east end of the site, a bed of shrubs and ornamental trees screens the southeast view, revealing the synagogue only as one reaches the entrance.

=== Form ===
Jaffe's design research introduced him to the wooden synagogues of Eastern Europe, where an inventive building style had developed in the early 18th century. He took particular interest in these buildings’ tiered roofs, lovingly crafted interiors, and the way that wood conveyed a simplicity and forthrightness. By the 1930s all extant examples of these synagogues were destroyed by the Nazis but in referencing this history, Jaffe revived a lost tradition.

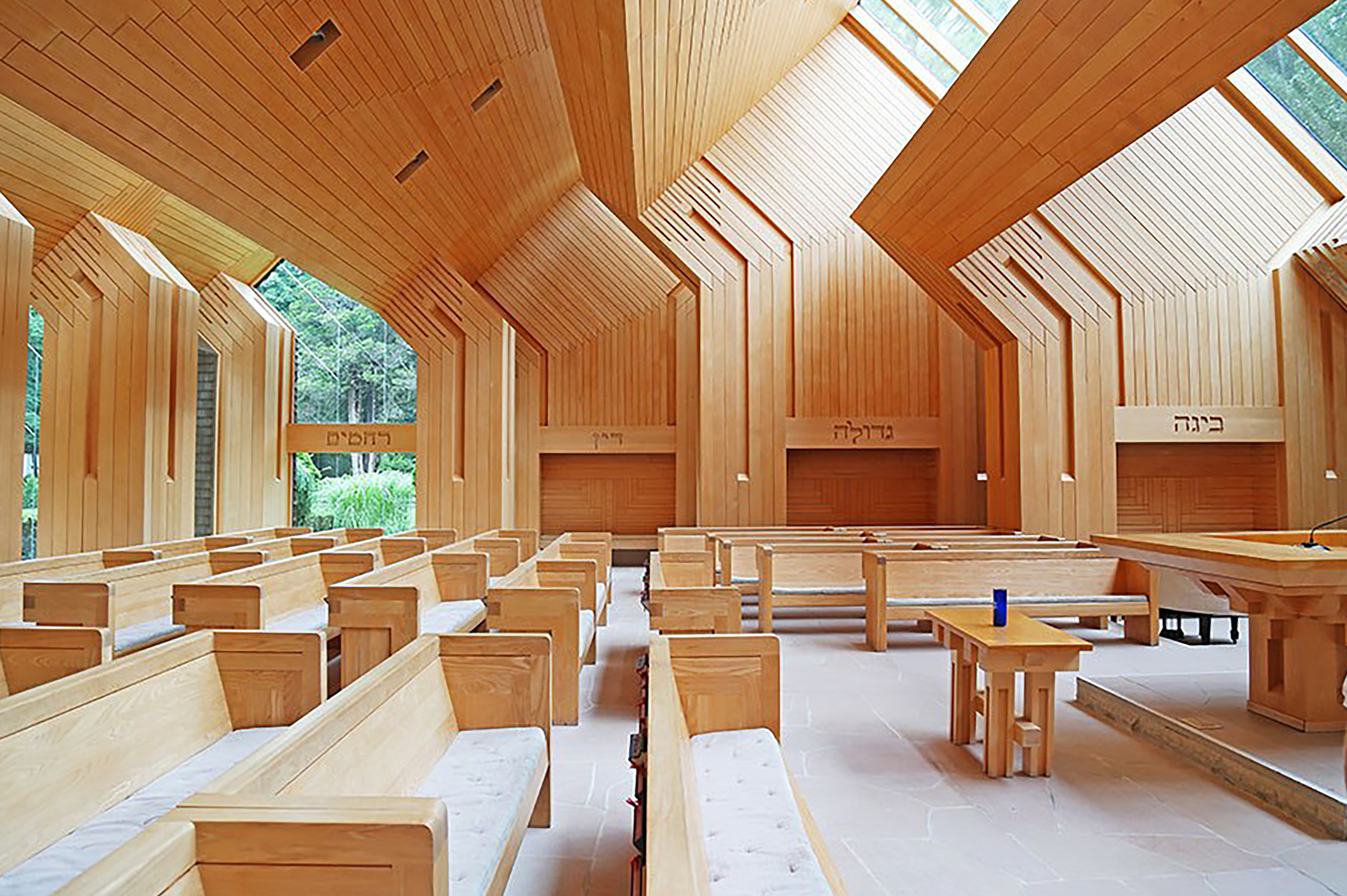
The sanctuary, in 2016

Viewed from the west elevation, the synagogue appears as a series of staggered bent forms that allude to the tiered roofs that Jaffe admired. On the south elevation—the longitudinal side and point of entry—the building resembles a long, low barn punctuated by vertical windows. Congregants enter at the southeast corner of the structure and turn west toward a loggia that acts as an interlude and a transition to the sanctuary space, visible beyond.

Jaffe researched Judaism and its symbolism extensively and applied his understanding of the faith in a variety of ways. His simple exterior reflects Judaism's desire to turn inward. Many Chasidic stories emphasize that the Messiah will be indistinguishable in outside appearance from any other ordinary person. Here, the understated exterior of the sanctuary conceals an exalted interior.

In the sanctuary space, seating faces north so that congregants sit with their backs to the road. Indirect light filters through a series of north-facing skylights—the main source of illumination—that evoke a spiritual sensibility and create the tent-like luminescence that Jaffe envisioned. The repetition of alternating glass and solid creates a governing rhythm that evokes a higher geometric order, and the structure of the building, concealed within wood cladding, assumes a weightlessness quality. Here again, Jaffe used symbolism, representing the numerology of the Kabbalah and the number ten, a significant number in Judaism. Moses received Ten Commandments and a quorum of ten men is required for public services. In the sanctuary, ten structural sections line the side-walls. Within each of these is a prayer niche; carvings in each niche list one of the ten attributes of God. The building becomes a collection of metaphorical aspects of faith, a space that's imbued with spirituality and meaning on multiple levels.

=== Materials and methods ===
In addition to its references to Eastern Europe, Jaffe's use of wood also reflects local vernacular architectural traditions that date to the early settlers of East Hampton. He clad the exterior of the wood-framed synagogue in plain cedar shingles, the preferred building material of the area since the 1600s. In a subtle variation on the decorative patterns typical of the late nineteenth-century Shingle Style (an interpretation of early colonial architecture), Jaffe integrated rows of Star of David-shaped shingles into shingle courses at several key locations.

Over the years the unstained exterior has weathered to an inky brown, while the finished interior paneling retains the pale blush of newly sawn wood. Architect I.M. Pei has said, “Architecture has to have an element of time.” Here, time expresses itself in the building's patina, amplifying the architectural message by distinguishing the realities of the exterior world from the eternal quality of the spiritual realm.

The interior space offers another play in contrast. Jaffe inverts the traditional relationship between cold stone and warm wood, pairing floors of soft, sensual Jerusalem limestone with clear Alaskan cedar paneling. The irregular stones, chipped at the edges, recalled a horizontal Wailing Wall. On the dados where the wood-clad walls meet stone, the exposed vertical edges are unfinished, a Jewish tradition for cornerstones. We, like stones, are works in progress. Every wall and ceiling surface is covered in paneling. Together with the pews and bima, crafted from the same material, this architectural condition contributes a unifying effect that prevents the elaborately detailed carvings from becoming overly dominant. Jaffe layered wood in a hierarchical fashion: beyond the smooth wood cladding of the interior, congregants see the aged shingles of the exterior and beyond these, mature trees.

=== Significance ===
Architect and author Henry Stolzman proclaimed Gates of the Grove as one of the finest examples of modern synagogue design. Architectural historian Carol Herselle Krinsky called it “a building that deserves an exceptional place among postwar synagogues in this country and Europe.”

The most telling commentary, perhaps, speaks of an emotional response to the space. Paul Goldberger described Gates of the Grove in Why Architecture Matters, writing, “In the sanctuary of the synagogue, as in all great religious buildings, something takes us a bit away from the secular life, away from the rational.” Indeed, the building's transcendent atmosphere incites reverence in the most skeptical non-believer. In that light, it shouldn't come as a surprise that Norman Jaffe later acknowledged that the project rekindled his own Jewish faith.
