= List of Colorado state symbols =

The location of the State of Colorado in the United States of America.

The government of the U.S. state of Colorado has many adopted symbols and emblems. Most of these symbols and emblems were adopted by acts of the Legislative Assembly of the Territory of Colorado, and after statehood, the General Assembly of the State of Colorado. A few of these symbols were adopted by executive action of the Governor. Federal agencies designated some of these symbols in honor of the state. Each entry explains the manner and date of adoption.

The first insignia of Colorado, the territorial motto: nil sine numine, was adopted by the First Session of the Territorial Legislature on November 6, 1861. The seal and coat of arms of the Territory of Colorado were specified by the First Session of the Territorial Legislature but not created until November 11, 1861.

== Insignia ==
Colorado state insignia
Type	Symbol	Date	Image
Coat of arms	Coat of Arms of the State of Colorado (Note: The Coat of Arms of the State of Colorado was implicitly defined by the legislation creating the Seal of the Territory of Colorado on November 11, 1861, and the Great Seal of the State of Colorado on March 15, 1877.)	November 11, 1861; March 15, 1877; CRS 24-80-901	
Flag	Flag of the State of Colorado (Note: The Colorado state flag was adopted on June 5, 1911. The 1911 legislation that adopted the flag did not stipulate the precise hues of red and blue to be used, and so on February 28, 1929, the General Assembly stipulated that the colors be the same as the colors on the U.S. flag. Controversy arose over the size of the letter 'C,' and on March 31, 1964, the General Assembly further modified the 1911 legislation by revising the distance from the staff for the letter 'C' and its diameter.)	June 5, 1911; SB 118-1911; February 28, 1928; SB 152-1929; March 31, 1964	
Logo	Colorado state government logo	March 26, 2019	
Motto	Nil sine numine (Latin: Nothing without providence)	November 6, 1861; November 6, 1876; CRS 24-80-901	
Nickname	Centennial State (Note: The State of Colorado is nicknamed the Centennial State because to joined the Union on August 1, 1876, four weeks after the centennial of the United States Declaration of Independence.)	Statehood on August 1, 1876	
Seal	Great Seal of the State of Colorado	November 11, 1861; March 15, 1877; CRS 24-80-901	
Slogan	Colorful Colorado	1950 unofficial	

== Living symbols ==
Colorado living symbols
Type	Symbol	Date	Image
Amphibian	Western tiger salamander Ambystoma mavortium	2012	
Bird	Lark bunting Calamospiza melancorys stejneger	1931	
Cactus	Claret cup cactus Echinocereus triglochidiatus	2014	
Fish	Greenback cutthroat trout Oncorhynchus clarki stomias	1994	
Flower	Rocky Mountain columbine Aquilegia coerulea	1899	
Grass	Blue grama grass Bouteloua gracilis	May 20, 1987; SJR13-1987	
Insect	Colorado hairstreak butterfly Hypaurotis crysalus	April 17, 1996; SB 122-1996; CRS 24-80-913	
Mammal	Rocky Mountain bighorn sheep Ovis canadensis canadensis	May 1, 1961; SB 294-1961; CRS 24-80-911	
Mushroom	The Emperor Agaricus julius	2025	
Pets	Colorado shelter pets Canis lupus familiaris & Felis catus	May 13, 2013; SB13-201	
Reptile	Western painted turtle Chrysemys picta bellii	March 18, 2008; HB08-1017	
Tree	Colorado blue spruce Picea pungens glauca	March 7, 1939; HJR 7-1939	

== Earth symbols ==
Colorado earth symbols
Type	Symbol	Date	Image
Fossil	Stegosaurus	April 28, 1982; Executive Order	
Gemstone	Aquamarine	April 30, 1971; HB 1104-1971; CRS 24-80-912	
Mineral	Rhodochrosite	April 17, 2002; CRS 24-80-912.5	
Rock	Yule Marble	March 9, 2004; HB04-1023; CRS 24-80-912.7	
Soil	Seitz soil	United States Department of Agriculture	

== Cultural symbols ==
Colorado cultural symbols
Type	Symbol	Date	Image
Folk dance	Square dance	March 16, 1992; HB 1058-1992; CRS 24-80-909.5	
Songs	"Where the Columbines Grow"	May 8, 1915; SB 308-1915; CRS 24-80-909	
Songs	"Rocky Mountain High"	March 12, 2007; SJR07-023; CRS 24-80-909	
Summer sport	Pack burro racing	May 8, 2012; HJR12-1021	
Tartan	Colorado state tartan	March 3, 1997; HJR97-1016	
Winter sport	Skiing and snowboarding	April 8, 2008	

== Highway route markers ==
Colorado highway route markers
Type	Symbol	Year	Image
State highways	Colorado state highway route marker	1967; Colorado Highway Commission	
Scenic byways	Colorado Scenic and Historic Byway route marker	1989; Colorado Scenic and Historic Byways Commission	

== Motor vehicle license plates ==
Typical Colorado state motor vehicle license plate
Type	Symbol	Year	Image
License plate	Colorado passenger automobile registration plate	1913; 2018; 2025; Colorado Department of Revenue	

== United States naval vessels ==
United States naval vessels named USS Colorado
Type	Symbol	Date	Image
Screw frigate	USS Colorado (1856) (Note: USS Colorado was named for the Colorado River, (Note: The Colorado River did not officially flow through the State of Colorado until July 25, 1921, when President Warren G. Harding signed House Joint Resolution 32 – To change the name of the Grand River in Colorado and Utah to the Colorado River. Prior to this date, the origin of the Colorado River was officially the confluence of the Grand and Green rivers at 38.1892°N 109.8857°W in what is now Canyonlands National Park of Utah.) and predated the creation of the Territory of Colorado in 1861.)	March 13, 1858 to June 8, 1875; United States Navy	An image of USS Colorado in China
Armored cruiser	USS Colorado (ACR-7)	January 19, 1905 renamed USS Pueblo (Note: USS Colorado was renamed USS Pueblo on November 9, 1916 to free up the name for a new battleship to be named USS Colorado.); November 9, 1916 to September 28, 1927; United States Navy	An image of USS Colorado in Hampden Roads
Battleship	USS Colorado (BB-45)	August 30, 1923 to January 1947; United States Navy	An image of USS Colorado in New York City
Nuclear submarine	USS Colorado (SSN-788)	Commissioned; March 17, 2018; United States Navy	

== United States postage stamp ==
Colorado statehood sesquicentennial United States postage stamp
Type	Symbol	Date	Image
U.S. postage stamp	2026 Colorado statehood sesquicentennial postage stamp (Note: The 2026 Colorado statehood sesquicentennial postage stamp commemorates the 150th anniversary of Colorado statehood. (Note: On Tuesday, August 1, 1876, U.S. President Ulysses S. Grant certified that the conditions of the Colorado Enabling Act had been fulfilled and issued Proclamation 230 — Admission of Colorado into the Union. The Territory of Colorado became the State of Colorado, the 38th U.S. state, also known as the Centennial State.) The forever stamp was designed by USPS art director Derry Noyes and features a photograph of 13,826-foot (4,214 m) Jagged Mountain by Colorado nature photographer John Fielder entitled Foggy Jagged Mountain, Weminuche Wilderness. The stamp was unveiled by Amber McReynolds, Chair of the Board of Governors of the United States Postal Service, and Colorado Governor Jared Polis in a ceremony at the History Colorado Center in Denver on Saturday, January 24, 2026.)	January 24, 2026; United States Postal Service	See USPS

== United States coin ==
2006 United States quarter dollar featuring Colorado
Type	Symbol	Date	Image
U.S. quarter dollar	Colorado state quarter dollar	June 14, 2006; United States Mint	

== See also ==
- Bibliography of Colorado
- Geography of Colorado
- History of Colorado
- Index of Colorado-related articles
- List of Colorado-related lists
- Outline of Colorado
