= List of U.S. postage stamps featuring Colorado =

Coordinates: 38.9972°N 105.5478°W

This is a list of United States postage stamps featuring the State of Colorado or subjects associated with the state.. This list includes information about each stamp including the date and place the stamps were first issued. Stamps issued prior to July 1, 1971, were issued by the United States Post Office. Beginning on July 1, 1971, stamps were issued by the new United States Postal Service.

== Stamps ==
Name	Stamp	Denomination	Date	Place
1898 Frémont on Rocky Mountains 5-cent postage stamp (Note: The 1898 Frémont on Rocky Mountains 5-cent postage stamp was initially issued as one of a sheet of nine postage stamps issued on Friday, June 17, 1898, at the Trans-Mississippi and International Exposition in Omaha, Nebraska. The 5-cent horizontal dull blue commemorative stamp depicts Captain John Charles Frémont lifting the Flag of the United States on a summit in the Rocky Mountains in 1843. The caption reads "FREMONT ON ROCKY MOUNTAINS." This series was only the second commemorative set issued by the United States Post Office and are considered some of the finest examples of 19th century postage stamps. The nine-stamp sheet was given a limited reissue in 1998.)		5 cents on a sheet of nine stamps	June 17, 1898	Omaha, Nebraska
1934 Mesa Verde National Park 4-cent postage stamp (Note: The 1934 Mesa Verde National Park 4-cent postage stamp was issued as part of the ten-stamp 1934 National Parks Series. The 4-cent horizontal brown commemorative stamp depicts the Cliff Palace at Mesa Verde National Park in Colorado. Below the illustration are the words MESA VERDE. The stamp was initially issued on Tuesday, September 25, 1934, at the Mesa Verde National Park post office.)		4 cents	September 25, 1934	Mesa Verde National Park
1940 Pony Express 80th Anniversary 3-cent postage stamp (Note: The 1940 Pony Express 80th Anniversary 3-cent postage stamp was issued to commemorate the 80th anniversary of the founding of the Pony Express, a horse and rider mail delivery system. The 3-cent horizontal henna brown commemorative stamp was initially issued on Wednesday, April 3, 1940, at Saint Joseph, Missouri, and Sacramento, California. The stamp depicts a Pony Express rider departing a route station with the caption PONY EXPRESS 80TH ANNIVERSARY. A Buffalo skull and the date 1860 sits in the upper left corner and a sheaf of wheat and the date 1940 sits in the upper right corner.)		3 cents	April 3, 1940	Saint Joseph, Missouri; Sacramento, California
1944 Transcontinental Railroad 75th Anniversary 3-cent postage stamp (Note: The 1944 Transcontinental Railroad 75th Anniversary 3-cent postage stamp commemorates the 75th anniversary of the completion of the first transcontinental railroad in America. The 3-cent horizontal violet commemorative stamp depicts the Golden Spike Ceremony at Promontory, Utah, where the Union Pacific Railroad and Central Pacific Railroad joined on Monday, May 10, 1869. Below the illustration is the caption COMPLETION OF FIRST TRANSCONTINENTAL RAILROAD. The stamp was initially issued at Omaha, Nebraska, Ogden, Utah, and San Francisco, California.)		3 cents	May 10, 1944	Omaha, Nebraska; Ogden, Utah; San Francisco, California
1951 Colorado 75th anniversary of statehood 3-cent postage stamp (Note: The 1951 Colorado 75th anniversary of statehood 3-cent postage stamp commemorated the 75th anniversary of Colorado statehood. (Note: On Tuesday, August 1, 1876, U.S. President Ulysses S. Grant certified that the conditions of the Colorado Enabling Act had been fulfilled and issued Proclamation 230 — Admission of Colorado into the Union. The Territory of Colorado became the State of Colorado, the 38th U.S. state, also known as the Centennial State.) The 3-cent horizontal dull blue stamp features a montage incorporating an image of the Colorado State Capitol against a distant background of the Mount of the Holy Cross on the left and the Great Seal of the State of Colorado on the right. A Colorado columbine, the state flower, appears in the lower left corner. Bronco Buster, a statue by Alexander Phimister Proctor installed in the Denver Civic Center, dominates the right side. Reading across the top, in dark modified Gothic is "3₵ US Postage." Arranged in two lines across the bottom in white-face, modified Gothic appears the wording "1876 Colorado 1951 75th Anniversary of Statehood." The stamp was first issued by the Minturn, Colorado, post office on Wednesday, August 1, 1951.)		3 cents	August 1, 1951	Minturn, Colorado
1976 Colorado state flag 13-cent postage stamp (Note: The 1976 Colorado state flag 13-cent postage stamp was issued as a part of the United States Bicentennial 50 State Flag Series. The 13-cent horizontal multicolor postage stamp features the Flag of the State of Colorado with the rotated state name Colorado on the right side. The United States Bicentennial logo sits in the lower left corner with the lower caption BICENTENNTIAL ERA 1776-1976. The series was designed by Walt Reed and was initially issued on Monday, February 23, 1976, at Philadelphia, Pennsylvania.)		13 cents	February 23, 1976	Philadelphia, Pennsylvania
1977 Colorado statehood centennial 13-cent postage stamp (Note: The 1977 Colorado statehood centennial 13-cent postage stamp belatedly commemorated the 100th anniversary of Colorado statehood. The 13-cent vertical multicolor stamp was designed by V. Jack Ruther. The stamp depicts a Colorado columbine, the state flower, against a Rocky Mountain background. The state name, "COLORADO," appears at the top, with "THE CENTENNIAL STATE," the state nickname, along the bottom. Production of the stamp was delayed to 1977 because of extensive United States Bicentennial activities. No specific acknowledgement of the Colorado centennial appears on the stamp. The stamp was initially issued on Saturday, May 21, 1977, at the 1977 ROMPEX event in Denver.)		13 cents	May 21, 1977	Denver, Colorado
1982 Colorado state bird and flower 20-cent postage stamp (Note: The 1982 Colorado state bird and flower 20-cent postage stamp.)		20 cents	April 14, 1982	Washington, D.C.
2007 Bighorn Sheep 17-cent postage stamp (Note: The 2007 Bighorn Sheep 17-cent postage stamp features an illustration of a Bighorn ram against a Rocky Mountain background. The 17-cent vertical multicolor stamp was designed by Carl T. Herrman with art from Nancy Stahl. The stamp was initially issued on Monday, May 21, 2007, at Washington, D.C.)	See USPS and SNPM	17 cents	May 21, 2007	Washington, D.C.
2007 Alpine Tundra 41-cent postage stamps (Note: The 2007 Alpine Tundra 41-cent postage stamps are a single-sheet collage of ten 41-cent postage stamps issued as a part of the 1999-2010 Nature of America Series. The sheet depicts 24 plants and animals found in the alpine tundra of Rocky Mountain National Park. The sheet was designed by Ethel Kessler with the art of John D. Dawson. The sheet was initially issued on Wednesday, August 8, 2007, at Rocky Mountain National Park.)	See USPS	sheet of ten 41-cent stamps	August 8, 2007	Rocky Mountain National Park
2008 Colorado state flag and mountain 42-cent postage stamp (Note: The 2008 Colorado state flag and mountain 42-cent postage stamp)	See SNPM and USPS	42 cents	June 14, 2008	Washington, D.C.
2021 Colorado Hairstreak Butterfly non-machineable surcharge stamp (Note: The 2021 Colorado Hairstreak Butterfly non-machineable surcharge stamp.)	See USPS	non-machineable surcharge (initially $1.27)	March 9, 2021	Estes Park, Colorado
2026 Colorado statehood sesquicentennial postage stamp (Note: The 2026 Colorado statehood sesquicentennial postage stamp commemorates the 150th anniversary of Colorado statehood. The horizontal multicolor forever stamp was designed by USPS art director Derry Noyes and features a photograph of 13,826-foot (4,214 m) Jagged Mountain by Colorado nature photographer John Feilder entitled Foggy Jagged Mountain, Weminuche Wilderness. The stamp was unveiled by Amber McReynolds, Chair of the Board of Governors of the United States Postal Service, and Colorado Governor Jared Polis in a ceremony at the History Colorado Center in Denver on Saturday, January 24, 2026.)	See USPS	forever stamp (initially 78 cents)	January 24, 2026	Denver, Colorado

== See also ==
- Bibliography of Colorado
- Geography of Colorado
- History of Colorado
- Index of Colorado-related articles
- List of Colorado-related lists
  - List of Colorado state symbols
- Outline of Colorado
- Postage stamps
  - Philately
- United States Post Office
  - United States Postal Service
