= Courvoisier (disambiguation) =

Courvoisier may refer to:

- Courvoisier, a brand of cognac
- Courvoisier (surname)
- Courvoisier's law (or Courvoisier syndrome, or Courvoisier's sign), a medical diagnostic named after him
- Courvoisier v. Raymond, a case decided by the Colorado Supreme Court
- Courvoisier, a historic manufacturer of complicated clocks and watches, controlled by Gallet & Co. during the 19th and early 20th century
- Hélio Courvoisier, a Swiss printing company, specialized in stamps
