= Justice Goddard =

Justice Goddard may refer to:

- Luther Marcellus Goddard (1840–1917), associate justice of the Colorado Supreme Court
- O. F. Goddard (1853–1943), associate justice of the Montana Supreme Court
- Rayner Goddard, Baron Goddard (1877–1971), Lord Chief Justice of England
