= Courvoisier v. Raymond =

1896 Colorado Supreme Court case

- Seal of Colorado
- Court: Colorado Supreme Court
- Full case name: Auguste Courvoisier v. Edwin S. Raymond
- Decided: September 21, 1896
- Citations: 23 Colo. 113 (1896); 47 P. 284

Case history
- Prior actions: Appeal from District Court, Arapahoe County

Court membership
- Judges sitting: Charles D. Hayt; John Campbell; Luther M. Goddard

Case opinions
- Unanimous opinion by Hayt

Courvoisier v. Raymond, 23 Colo. 113 (1896), was a case decided by the Colorado Supreme Court that affirmed the use of a reasonableness standard when determining the validity of a mistaken self-defense.

== Factual background ==
Auguste Courvoisier ran a jewelry store in Denver, and lived in an apartment above the store. On the night of 12 June 1892, a group of men attempted to break into the store. Courvoisier retrieved his revolver and chased them outside. He fired 2-3 shots into the air to drive the group off, which attracted the attention of a group of police officers that came to arrest the intruders.

Among these officers was Edwin Raymond. While the other officers apprehended the group of men, Raymond approached Courvoisier, stating that he was a police officer and to stop shooting. Courvoisier fired one shot into Raymond's abdomen, injuring him.

== Procedure and Arguments ==
Raymond sued Courvoisier for $30,150, alleging "great physical pain" and permanent disability. He also argued that, in shooting a police officer, Courvoisier had committed a breach of the peace and acted recklessly, making him liable for damages.

Courvoisier conceded that he had fired the shot that injured Raymond. However, he argued that Raymond had approached him "in a threatening attitude," and that a reasonable man under the same circumstances would believe it necessary to shoot in self-defense.

The District Court of Arapahoe County found for Raymond and awarded him $3,143. However, Courvoisier appealed to the Colorado Supreme Court. Courvoisier challenged the district court holding on five grounds. Four of these challenges concerned the jury and evidence presented in this case.

Courvoisier's fifth challenge was that the district court had provided incorrect jury instructions. The jury instructions in the district court included the following:

The court instructs you that if you believe from the evidence, that, at the time the defendant shot the plaintiff, the plaintiff was not assaulting the defendant, then your verdict should be for the plaintiff.

Courvoisier argued that this instruction was insufficient because it did not permit the jury to consider whether he reasonably believed he was in danger from Raymond. If this was the case, then Courvoisier could not be found liable.

== Decision ==
The Colorado Supreme Court agreed with Courvoisier's jury instructions argument. Since the trial court failed to instruct the jury to find Courvoisier not liable if he had acted reasonably under the circumstances, and that the evidence was sufficient for a jury to find Courvoisier had acted reasonably, the court held in favor of Courvoisier and reversed for Raymond.
