= Colorado state tartan =

Typical Tartan of Colorado

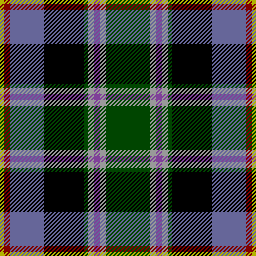
The Colorado State Tartan

The Colorado state tartan is the Scottish-style tartan pattern officially adopted by the US State of Colorado to represent the state in various functions and occasions.

== Official state tartan ==
The Colorado General Assembly adopted House Joint Resolution 97-1016 on March 3, 1997, designating an official Colorado state tartan. The tartan is a pattern and colors that symbolize Colorado's splendor and history. The pattern or sett consists of primary blocks of forest green and cerulean blue separated by broad dividing bands of black, with the forest green checks containing two pairs of tram tracks consisting of lavender and white and with the cerulean blue checks containing a gold stripe with red guard lines. The official state tartan is a district tartan, which may be worn by anyone.

The Colorado state tartan thread count as recorded by the Scottish Tartans Authority (and thus also by the Scottish Register of Tartans which subsumed the STA records):

[Y/8] R6 MB34 K40 G4 W6 Lv6 W6 [G/64]

Colorado House Joint Resolution 96-1014 designated July 1 as Tartan Day in the State of Colorado.

== See also ==
- List of Colorado state symbols
- List of U.S. state tartans
- State of Colorado
