= Bibliography of Colorado =

The Flag of the State of Colorado

The Great Seal of the State of Colorado

The location of the State of Colorado in the United States of America.

This is a bibliography of the U.S. State of Colorado.

== General history ==
- Abbot, Carl; Stephen J. Leonard; David McComb (2011). Colorado: A History of the Centennial State (4th ed.). Boulder, Colorado: Colorado Associated University Press. ISBN 978-1457109553.
- Andrews, Thomas (2010). Killing for Coal: America's Deadliest Labor War. Cambridge, Massachusetts: Harvard University Press.
- Athearn, Robert G. (1976). The Coloradans. Albuquerque, New Mexico: University of New Mexico Press. ISBN 978-0826306234.
- Brown, Robert Leaman (1968). Ghost Towns of the Colorado Rockies. Caldwell, Idaho: Caxton Printers. ISBN 978-0870043420.
- Ellis, Richard; Duane A. Smith (2005). Colorado: A History in Photographs (4th ed.). Niwot, Colorado: University Press of Colorado. ISBN 978-0870817892.
- Fay, Abbot (1984). Ski Tracks in the Rockies: A Century of Colorado Skiing. Louisville, Colorado: Cordillera Press. ISBN 978-0917895029.
- Fielder, John (1999). Colorado 1870–2000. Englewood, Colorado: Westcliffe Publishers. ISBN 978-1565793477.
- Griswold, Don L. (1958). Colorado's Century of "Cities". Denver, Colorado: Smith-Brooks Printing Company.
- Hafen, LeRoy Reuben (1948). Colorado and Its People: A Narrative and Topical History of the Centennial State. New York, New York: Lewis Historical Publishing Company.
- Hall, Frank (1889–1895). History of the State of Colorado ... from 1858 to 1890. Chicago, Illinois: Blakely Printing Company. ISBN 978-1110812097.
- Holthaus, Gary; Wilkinson, Charles F., eds. (1991). A Society to Match the Scenery: Personal Visions of the Future of the American West. Boulder, Colorado: University Press of Colorado. ISBN 978-0870812415.
- Howe, Elvon L., ed. (1950). Rocky Mountain Empire: Revealing Glimpses of the West in Transition from Old to New. Garden City, New York: Doubleday and Company. ISBN 978-1245536141.
- Jessen, Kenneth Christian (1986). Colorado Gunsmoke: True Stories of Outlaws and Lawmen on the Colorado Frontier. Boulder, Colorado: Pruett Publishing Company.
- Kingsbury, Joseph Lyman (1922). The Development of the Colorado Territory, 1858 – 1865. Chicago, Illinois: University of Chicago.
- Kinsey, Joni (1992). Thomas Moran and the Surveying of the American West. Washington, D.C.: Smithsonian Institution Press.
- Knight, Harold Vincent (1971). Working in Colorado: A Brief History of the Colorado Labor Movement. Boulder, Colorado: University of Colorado Center for Labor Education and Research.
- Lee, W. Storrs (1970). Colorado: A Literary Chronicle. New York, New York: Funk and Wagnalls.
- Leonard, Stephen (1993). Trials and Triumphs: Colorado during the Great Depression. Niwot, Colorado: University of Colorado Press.
- McCarthy, Michael (1977). Hour of Trial: The Conservation Conflict in Colorado and the West, 1891-1907. Norman, Oklahoma: University of Oklahoma Press.
- Metcalf, Fay D.; Thomas J. Noel; Duane A. Smith (1984). Colorado: Heritage of the Highest State. Boulder, Colorado: Pruett Publishing Company.
- Noel, Thomas (2015). Colorado: A Historical Atlas (Revised ed.). Norman: University of Oklahoma Press. ISBN 9780806153537.
- Rogers, James Grafton (1957). The Rush to the Rockies; Background of Colorado History. Denver, Colorado: State Historical Society of Colorado.
- Shikes, Robert H. (1986). Rocky Mountain Medicine: Doctors, Drugs, and Disease in Early Colorado. Boulder, Colorado: Johnson Books.
- Sibley, George. Water Wranglers - The 75-Year History of the Colorado River District: A Story About the Embattled Colorado River and the Growth of the West. Grand Junction, Colorado, U.S.: Colorado River District. ISBN 978-1-938393-02-0 Copyright and first printing, September 13, 2012, George Sibley and Colorado River District.
- Sprague, Marshall (1976). Colorado: A Bicentennial History. New York, New York: Norton.
- Toby, Emma C. (1930). History of the Formation of the Counties and History of the Counties of Colorado. Denver, Colorado: University of Denver.
- Ubbelohde, Carl; Maxine Benson; Duane A. Smith (1995). A Colorado History (7th ed.). Boulder, Colorado: Pruett Publishing Company.
- West, Elliott (1998). The Contested Plains: Indians, Goldseekers, and the Rush to Colorado. Lawrence, Kansas: University Press of Kansas.
- Whiteside, James (1999). Colorado: A Sports History. Niwot, Colorado: University Press of Colorado. ISBN 9780870815508.
- Wickens, James F. (1979). Colorado in the Great Depression. New York, New York: Garland Publishing.

== Agriculture and livestock ==
- Colorado State Grange (1975). Colorado State Grange History: 1874-1975. Westminster, Colorado: North Suburban Printing & Publishing Incorporated.
- Dobie, J. Frank (1964). Cow People. Austin, Texas: University of Texas Press.
- Easterly, Lewis H. The Agricultural and livestock Interest of Gunnison County. Gunnison City, Colorado: 1916.
- Frink, Maurice; W. Turrentine Jackson; Agnes Wright Spring (1956). When Grass was King: Contributions to the Western Range Cattle Industry Study. Denver, Colorado: University of Colorado Press.
- Goff, Richard; Robert H. McCaffree (1967). Century in the Saddle. Denver, Colorado: Colorado Cattlemen's Centennial Commission.
- Goff, Richard; Robert H. McCaffree; Doris Sterbenz (1967). Centennial Brand Book. Boulder, Colorado: Johnson Publishing Company.
- Hall, Frank Louis. "Structural Changes in Colorado’s Agriculture". Fort Collins, Colorado: Colorado State University, 1971.
- Marriott, Alice (1953). Hell on Horses and Women. Norman, Oklahoma: University of Oklahoma Press.
- McCann, Roud; Thomas H. Summers (1924). Colorado's Agriculture. Fort Collins, Colorado: Colorado Agricultural College, Extension Service.
- Meyers, Sandra L. (1982). Westering Women and the Frontier Experience, 1800-1915. Albuquerque, New Mexico: University of New Mexico Press.
- Mumey, Nolie, ed. (1958). Brand Book of the Denver Westerners. Johnson Publishing.
- First Forest Ranger – Len Shoemaker. Denver: Denver Possee, V0l. VII, 1951.
- Osgood, Ernest (1929). The Day of the Cattleman. Minneapolis, Minnesota: University of Minnesota Press.
- Peake, Ora Brooks (1937). The Colorado Range Cattle Industry. Glendale, California: The Arthur H. Clark Company.
- Sammons, Judy Buffington (2003). Tall Grass and Good Cattle: A Century of Ranching in the Gunnison Country (3rd ed.). Gunnison, Colorado: Western State Foundation, Inc.
- Shores, C. W. (1962). Rockwell, Wilson (ed.). Memoirs of a Lawman. Denver, Colorado: Sage Books.
- Shores, C. W. The Cooperative Century. Boulder: Johnson Publishing Company, 1967. The Colorado Cattlemen’s Centennial Commission.
- Smith, P. David; Bezek, Lyn (2010). On the Backs of Burros: Bringing Civilization to Colorado. Lake City, Colorado: Western Reflections Publishing Company.
- Steinel, Alvin Theodore (1926). History of Agriculture in Colorado. Fort Collins, Colorado: The State Agricultural College.
- Wallace, Betty (1960). Gunnison Country. Denver, Colorado: Sage Books.
- Wallace, Betty (1964). History with the Hide Off. Denver, Colorado: Sage Books.
- Wolfenstine, Manfred R. (1970). Adams, Ramon F. (ed.). The Manual of Brands and Marks. Norman. Oklahoma: University of Oklahoma Press.

=== Journals, associations and organizations ===
- Gunnison County Stockgrower’s Association, 1894 – 1994. U.S.A.: GCSA, 1994. Leslie J. Savage Library, Call number: SF196 C6 G8 1994.
- Fogg, H. H. The First Decade of the Gunnison Stockgrower’s Association: Personalities and Trends,. Gunnison, Colorado: In possession of the Gunnison Stockgrower’s Association. 1894 – 1904.
- Gunnison County Stockgrower’s Association Since 1894,. 75th Anniversary Issue: pre-print from The Cattle Guard, August 1967.

=== Federal documents ===
- Gunnison County Abstract of Assessment and Levies, 1915 – 1922,. Located in the Gunnison County Courthouse, (The Blackstock Building).
- The Federal Range Code, (commonly known as "The Taylor Grazing Act", under the "Act of June 28, 1934, as amended by the Act of June 26, 1936").
- Ker, Bill. Gunnison National Forest: a Brief History. USFS: Gunnison Field Office, undated.
- Colorado Senate Journal 15th Day, Jan. 21, 1976.
- Range Rider Newsletter Nov. 2, 1993. Publication of Gunnison Soil Conservation District.

== Architecture ==
- Dallas, Sandra (1967). No More Than Five in a Bed: Colorado Hotels in the Old Days. Norman, Oklahoma: University of Oklahoma Press.
- Jackson, Olga (1966). Architecture/Colorado: Mountains Mines & Mansions. Denver, Colorado: American Institute of Architects, Colorado Chapter.
- Noel, Thomas Jacob (1997). Buildings of Colorado. New York, New York: Oxford University Press.

== Education ==
- McGiffert, Michael (1964). The Higher Learning in Colorado: An Historical Study, 1860-1940. Denver, Colorado: Sage Books.

Rockwell, Noraetta, The Early History of Gunnison County, Colorado Schools. Unpublished Master’s Thesis, WSC, 1953.

== Forest Service ==
Shoemaker, Len. Saga of a Forest Ranger. Boulder: University of Colorado Press, 1958.

== Geology ==
Bueler, William M. Roof of the Rockies: A History of Mountaineering in Colorado. Boulder, Colorado: Pruett Publishing Company, 1974.

Chronic, John. Prairie, Peak, and Plateau : A Guide to the Geology of Colorado. Denver, Colorado: Colorado Geological Survey, 1972.

Weimer, Robert J. and Haun. John D. ed. Guide to the Geology of Colorado. Denver, Colorado: Geological Society of America, Rocky Mountain Association of Geologists & Colorado Scientific Society, 1960.

== Government ==
Lamm, Richard D. Pioneers & Politicians: 10 Colorado Governors in Profile. Boulder, Co.: Pruett Publishing Company, 1984.

Lindbloom, Harold Seth. Colorado Citizen. Denver, Colorado: Old West Publishing Company, 1966.

Martin, Curtis. Colorado Government and Politics. Boulder, Colorado: Pruett Press, 1964.

Waton, Rodger Alan. Colorado: A Practical Guide to its Government and Politics. Fort Collins, Colorado: Shields Publishing Company, 1973.

== Military ==
Brandes, T. Donald. Military Posts of Colorado. Fort Collins, Colorado: Old Army Press, 1973.

Nankivell, John H. History of the Military Organizations of the State of Colorado: 1860 – 1935. Denver, Colorado: W. H. Kistler Stationery Company, 1935.

== Mining and industry ==
Able, Mary Prentiss. Mines and Mills of Colorado. Denver, Colorado: The Author, 1976.

Dempsey, Stanley, and James E. Fell, Jr. Mining the Summit: Colorado's Ten Mile District, 1860-1960. University of Oklahoma Press, 1986.

Dorset, Phyllis. The New Eldorado: The Story of Colorado’s Gold and Silver Rushes. New York: Macmillan, 1970.

Henderson, Charles William. Mining in Colorado; A History of Discovery, Development and Production. Washington D. C., Government Printing Office, 1926.

Hollister, Ovando James. The Mines of Colorado. New York, Arno Press, [c1867]1973.

King, Joseph E. A Mine to Make a Mine: Financing the Colorado Mining Industry, 1859-1902. Texas A&M University Press, 1977.

Nelson, A. P. Gunnison County, Colorado. Pitkin, Colorado: A. P. Nelson Mining, 1916. P. 47.

Nossaman, Allen. Many More Mountains: An Illustrated History of the Earliest Exploration in the High San Juans of Southwestern Colorado and the Settlement and Founding of Silverton, Colorado. Denver, Colo.: Sundance Publications, 1989.

Smith, Duane A. Colorado Mining: A Photographic History. Albuquerque, New Mexico: University of New Mexico Press, 1977.

Smith, Duane A. The Trail of Gold and Silver: Mining in Colorado, 1859-2009. Boulder, CO: University Press of Colorado, 2009.

Southworth, Dave. Colorado Mining Camps. Round Rock, Texas: Wild Horse Publishing, 1997.

Wolle, Muriel Sibell. Stampede to Timberline: The Ghost Towns and Mining Camps of Colorado. Chicago, Illinois: Swallow Press, 1974.

== Native Americans ==
Coel, Margaret. Chief Left Hand: Southern Arapaho. Norman: University of Oklahoma Press, 1981.

Crum, Sally. People of the Red Earth: American Indians of Colorado. Santa Fe, New Mexico: Ancient City Press, 1996.

Hafen, Le Roy Reuben. The Indians of Colorado. Denver, Colorado: State Historical Society of Colorado, 1952.

Hughes, Johnson Donald. American Indians in Colorado. Boulder, Colorado: Pruett Publishing Company, 1977.

Jones, Sondra. Being and Becoming Ute: The Story of an American Indian People. Salt Lake City: University of Utah Press, 2019. ISBN 9781607816669.

Marsh, Charles S. The Utes of Colorado – People of the Shining Mountains. Boulder, Colorado: Pruett Publishing Company, 1982. ISBN 978-0-87108-620-4 (pbk).

Marsh, Charles Seabrooke. People of the Shining Mountains: The Utes of Colorado. Boulder, Colorado: Pruett Publishing Company, 1982.

Parkhill, Forbes. The Blazed Trail of Antoine Leroux. Los Angeles: Westernlore Press, 1965.

Smead, Cophine. Relations with the Plains Indians of Colorado, 1859 – 1869. Denver, Colorado: University of Colorado, 1947.

Young, Richard Keith. The Ute Indians of Colorado in the Twentieth Century. Norman, Oklahoma: University of Oklahoma Press. 1997.

=== Magazine Articles ===
Jackson, William H. "A Visit to the Los Pinos Indian Reservation." The Colorado Magazine, XV, Nov. 1938, pp. 201 – 209.

Borland, Lois. "Ho For the Reservation: Settlement of the Western Slope." The Colorado Magazine, XXIX, Jan. 1952, pp. 56 – 75.

Vader, Diane. "Mr. Outcalt and the Indians." Gunnison Country Magazine, Gunnison: B & B Printers, 1976.

== Postal History ==
- Bauer, William H.; Ozment, James L.; Willard, John H. (1990). Colorado Post Offices 1859-1989. Golden, Colorado: Colorado Railroad Historical Foundation. ISBN 0-918654-42-4.

== Transportation ==
Beebe, Lucius Morris. Narrow Gauge in the Rockies. Berkeley, California: Howell-North, 1958.

Dines, Glen. Overland Stage: The Story of the Famous Overland Stagecoaches of the 1860s. New York: MacMillan, 1961.

Everett, George G. The Cavalcade of Railroads in Central Colorado. Denver: Golden Bell Press, 1966.

Feitz, Leland. Colorado Trolleys. Golden, Colorado: Bell Press, 1971.

Jessen, Kenneth. Railroads of Northern Colorado. Boulder, CO: Pruett Pub. Co., 1982.

LeMassena, Robert A. Colorado’s Mountain Railroads. Golden, Colorado: Smoking Stack Press, 1963 – 1968.

Ormes, Robert M. Railroads and the Rockies: A Record of Lines In and Near Colorado. Denver, Colorado: Sage Books, 1963.

Smith, P. David, and Lyn Bezek. On the Backs of Burros: Bringing Civilization to Colorado. Lake City, CO: Western Reflections Publishing Company, 2010.

Stocking, Hobart E. The Road to Santa Fe. New York: Hastings House, 1971.

Walker, Henry Pickering. The Rise and Decline of High Plains Wagon Freighting, 1822–1880. Boulder, Colorado: University of Colorado, 1965.

Wiatrowski, Claude A. Railroads of Colorado: Your Guide to Colorado's Historic Trains and Railway Sites. Stillwater, MN: Voyager Press, 2002.

== See also ==
- Geography of Colorado
- History of Colorado
- Index of Colorado-related articles
- List of Colorado-related lists
- Outline of Colorado
- List of bibliographies on American history
