= List of U.S. state mushrooms =

Nine U.S. states (California, Colorado, Minnesota, Illinois, Kentucky, Oregon, Texas, Utah, and Vermont, have officially declared a state mushroom.

Minnesota was the first to declare a species; Morchella esculenta was chosen as its state mushroom in 1984, and codified into Statute in 2010. At the time the state mushroom was named, the species epithet Morchella esculenta applied to North American as well as European yellow morels, but following taxonomic revisions is now solely a European name.

Four other states, Missouri, Washington, Massachusetts, and New York have had state mushrooms proposed in their state legislatures.

== Current state mushrooms ==
State	Species	Image	Year of designation	Ref
California	Cantharellus californicus	A golden colored mushroom among dead leaves and foliage.	2023	
Colorado	Agaricus julius	Agaricus julius	2025	
Illinois	Calvatia gigantea	Giant Puffball	2024	
Kentucky	Lactarius indigo	A blue milkcap mushroom (Lactarius indigo) is pictured flipped upside-down, with its gills up, in a Kentucky forest.	2026	
Minnesota	Morchella esculenta	A brown, sponge-like cap on a white stem, surrounded by dead grass.	2010 (Note: Morchella esculenta was chosen as the state mushroom in 1984, but it was not codified until 2010.)	
Oregon	Cantharellus formosus	A collection of golden colored mushrooms with irregularly shaped caps on a plate.	1999	
Texas	Chorioactis geaster	A mushroom that somewhat resembles a dark brown or black cigar before it splits open radially into a starlike arrangement of four to seven leathery rays.	2021	
Utah	Boletus edulis	A plump mushroom with a brown cap and white stem.	2023	
Vermont	Hericium americanum Bear's head tooth fungus		2024	

== Proposed state mushrooms ==
State	Species	Image	Ref
Massachusetts	Calvatia gigantea		
Missouri	Cantharellus lateritius	A large, golden-coloured mushroom with an irregular cap growing from leaflitter	
New York	Lactarius peckii		
Washington	Tricholoma magnivelare	Bulbous white mushrooms on the forest floor	
Washington	Tricholoma murrillianum	Bulbous white mushrooms on the forest floor	
