= Luther Marcellus Goddard =

American judge (1840–1917)

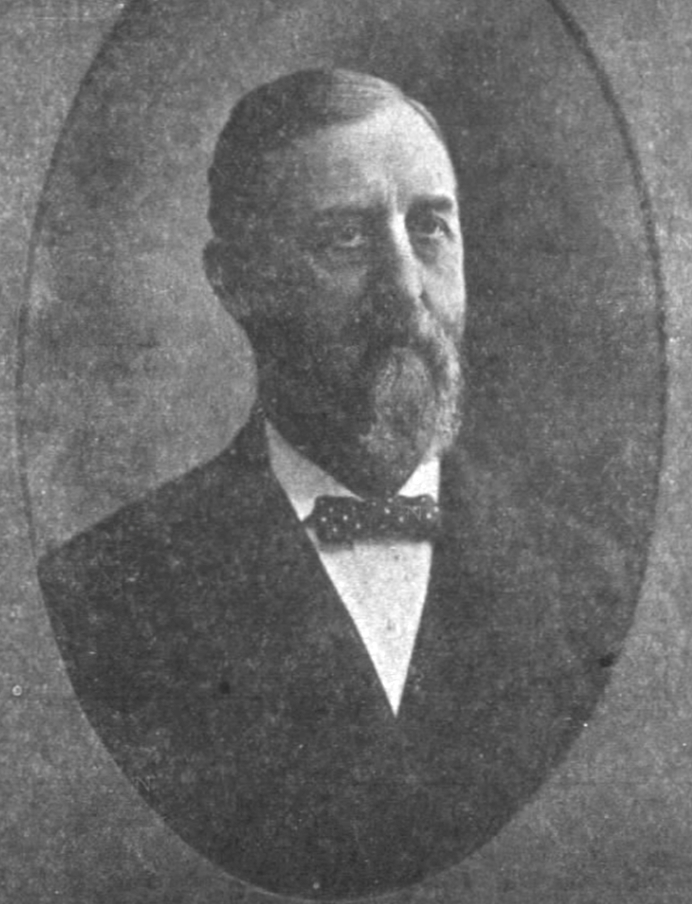
- Portrait photograph of Luther Marcellus Goddard in 1908, from a campaign advertisement.

Colorado Supreme Court

Associate Justice

Personal details
- Born: October 27, 1840 Palmyra, New York, US
- Died: 20 May 1917 (aged 76)

Luther Marcellus Goddard (October 27, 1840 – May 20, 1917) was an associate justice of the Colorado Supreme Court from 1891 to 1901 and from 1905 to 1909.

== Education and early career ==
Goddard was born in Palmyra, New York and went to elementary school there. His family moved to Abingdon, Illinois, where he completed his secondary schooling. In 1862, he moved to Leavenworth, Kansas and began to read law, then enrolling in the University of Chicago Law School in 1864. He graduated in 1865 and was named class valedictorian. He was admitted to the bar soon after graduating and then returned to Leavenworth.

In Leavenworth, Goddard served for two years as deputy county attorney, then he was elected county attorney for two terms. In fall 1871, he was elected to serve in the Kansas legislature.

== Career in Colorado ==
Goddard moved to Leadville, Colorado in 1878. There, he became involved in the mining industry and also practiced law. In 1882 and 1888, he was elected and re-elected judge of the 5th Judicial District.

An attempt was made to remove Goddard from his district court seat through disbarment. He was accused of agreeing to accept a campaign contribution in return for appointing the donor clerk of the court if he were elected. The court ruled in favor of Goddard.

In 1892, the Populist and Democratic parties nominated him as their candidate for the Colorado Supreme Court Justice, and he was elected, serving until his term ended in 1901. While serving on the court this term, Goddard was one of the three justices that heard the Courvoisier v. Raymond case, a case that involved mistaken self-defense. During this period he moved to Denver.

In 1905, the Supreme Court was reorganized, and Governor Peabody appointed Goddard to serve a second term on the court. Soon after he began serving his second Supreme Court term, a bomb was placed at his Denver residence, but it didn't go off.

== Death ==
Goddard died May 20, 1917, in Denver, age 79.
