= Courvoisier (surname) =

The surname Courvoisier or de Courvoisier is in origin a French word, meaning 'shoemaker'. The word comes from Old French courveis ('leather') which itself comes from the Latin word Cordubense meaning 'from Cordova', originally referring to a kind of leather associated with that city.

Notable people with the name include:

- François Benjamin Courvoisier (died 1840), valet and murderer of Lord William Russell
- Fritz Courvoisier, Swiss watchmaker, military and political figure
- Jean Joseph Antoine de Courvoisier, French magistrate and politician
- Leopold Courvoisier, Swiss astronomer
- Ludwig Georg Courvoisier (1843–1918), Swiss surgeon
- René Courvoisier, Swiss field hockey player
- Sylvie Courvoisier, Swiss composer and musician
- Walter Courvoisier, Swiss composer, son of Ludwig Georg Courvoisier
