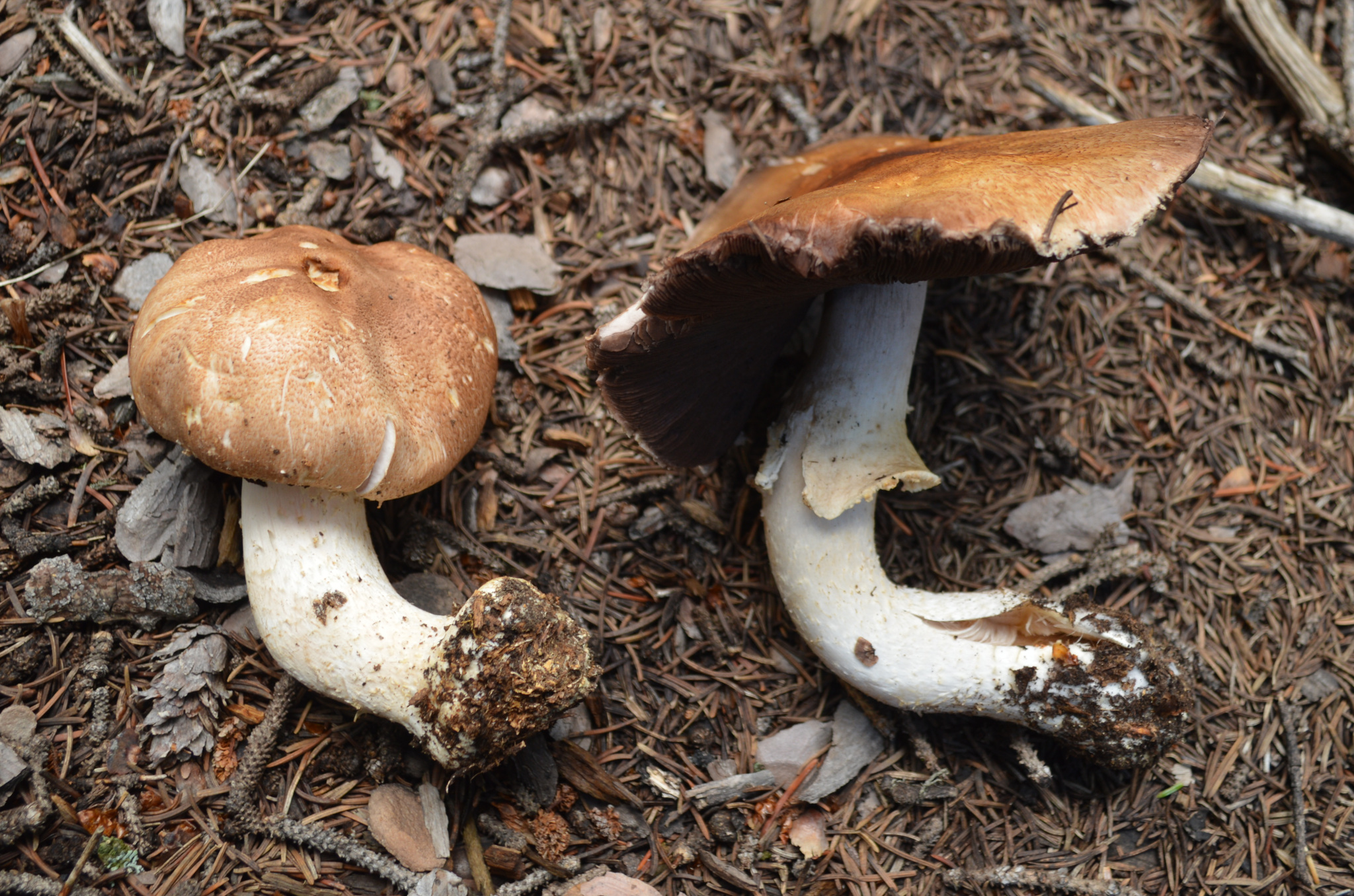

Scientific classification
- Kingdom: Fungi
- Division: Basidiomycota
- Class: Agaricomycetes
- Order: Agaricales
- Family: Agaricaceae
- Genus: Agaricus
- Species: A. julius

Binomial name
- Agaricus julius Kerrigan

= Agaricus julius =

Species of fungus

Agaricus julius
- Mycological characteristics
- Gills on hymenium
- Cap is convex
- Hymenium is free
- Stipe has a ring
- Spore print is brown to blackish-brown
- Ecology is saprotrophic
- Edibility is unknown

Agaricus julius, commonly known as the emperor or the prince, is a basidiomycete fungus of the genus Agaricus, closely related to Agaricus augustus.

== Taxonomy ==
Agaricus julius was first described by American mycologist Richard W. Kerrigan in 2016.

== Description ==
The cap is 5–15 cm (2–6 in) wide, sometimes larger. The appearance of this mushroom is very similar to the store-bought portobello mushroom. It stains slightly yellow where damaged or nicked. The cap is light brown with a scaled pattern. When young, it has a cottony veil covering the gills. The mushroom can become quite large as the cap opens. The gills are initially pinkish-gray to pink when young, then turning brown at maturity; crowded; not attached to the stipe.

The stipe is 2–3 cm (3/4–1 1/4 in) wide, and 5–15 cm (2–6 in) long. The stalk is usually shaggy when young, becoming smooth at maturity, curved with a larger bulbous base. Once the cap opens it leaves a thin yellowish to light brown skirt-like ring on the stipe. When mature, the stalk can turn darker above the ring. The cap flesh can stain yellow in fresh specimens where nicked or handled. It has a very distinct cherry-almond smell. The spore color is chocolate brown.

== In culture ==
In March 2025, the fungus became the state mushroom of Colorado.
