= Seal of Colorado =

Official government emblem of the U.S. state of Colorado

Coordinates: 38.9972°N 105.5478°W

Great Seal of the State of Colorado
- Armiger: State of Colorado
- Adopted: March 15, 1877
- Motto: Nil sine numine "Nothing without providence"

The seal of the state of Colorado is an adaptation of the territorial seal which was adopted by the First Territorial Assembly on November 6, 1861. The only changes made to the territorial seal design being the substitution of the words "State of Colorado" and the figures "1876" for the corresponding inscriptions on the territorial seal. The first General Assembly of the State of Colorado approved the adoption of the state seal on March 15, 1877. The Colorado Secretary of State alone is authorized to affix the Great Seal of Colorado to any document whatsoever.

By statute, the seal of the state is two and one-half inches in diameter with the following devices inscribed thereon: At the top is the Eye of Providence or "All Seeing Eye" within a triangle, from which golden rays radiate on two sides. Below the eye is a Roman fasces, a bundle of birch or elm rods with a battle axe bound together with a ribbon of red, white and blue with the words, Union and Constitution. The bundle of rods bound together symbolizes strength which is lacking in the single rod. The axe symbolizes authority and leadership. Below the fasces is a heraldic shield bearing across the top a red sky behind three snow-capped mountains and clouds above them. The lower half of the shield has two miner's tools, the pick and sledge hammer, crossed on a golden ground. Below the shield, on a scroll, is the motto "Nil Sine Numine", Latin words meaning "Nothing without providence" or "nothing without the Deity", and at the bottom the figures 1876, the year Colorado came into statehood.

The design for the territorial seal which served as a model for the state seal or Great Seal of Colorado has been variously credited, but the individual primarily responsible was Lewis Ledyard Weld, the territorial secretary, appointed by President Abraham Lincoln in July 1861. There is also evidence that Territorial Governor William Gilpin was also at least partially responsible for the design. Both Weld and Gilpin were knowledgeable in the art and symbolism of heraldry. Elements of design from both the Weld and Gilpin families’ coats of arms are incorporated in the territorial seal.

== Motto ==
Nil sine numine is the state motto of Colorado. The Latin phrase appears to be an adaptation from Virgil's Aeneid where in Book II, line 777 the words "...non haec sine numine devum eveniunt" are found.

The Colorado Department of Personnel and Administration said about the translation of the motto:

At recurring intervals, discussion has ensued concerning interpretation of this Latin phrase which commonly translated is "'Nothing without providence'". Others say it is "Nothing without God". The Merriam-Webster dictionary translates it as "Nothing without the divine will". In the early mining days of the state, the unregenerate said it meant "nothing without a new mine". The word "numen" (ablative numine) means any divinity, god or goddess, or divine spirit. The best evidence of intent of Colorado's official designers and framers of the resolution for adoption of the seal is contained in the committee report wherein clear distinction was made between "numine" and "Deo" and it specifically states that the committee's interpretative translation was "Nothing without the Deity".

The motto appeared when Colorado's first territorial governor, Gilpin, asked Secretary of the Territory L. L. Weld for a suitable motto for the state seal. According to the story, Weld said: "Well, Governor, what would you suggest?" Gilpin is said to have paused in thought for a moment and then responded "Nil Sine Numine". On November 6, 1861 by joint resolution the First Territorial Assembly adopted the motto with the territorial seal.

Nil sine numine is the motto of the Weld family of Lulworth Castle in Dorset, England. The family are descended from Sir Humphrey Weld, Lord Mayor of London in 1601 and were notable as a recusant family prior to Catholic Emancipation in the 19th century. The Luttrell Psalter, a famous medieval manuscript dated to the 14th century, contains inside its binding an armorial bookplate of Thomas Weld (1750–1810), one of the book's owners, and the motto on the plate's ribbon reads "nil sine numine".

The motto is also used by the Colorado School of Mines, an engineering university in Golden, Colorado, High Point University, a small liberal arts university in High Point, North Carolina, and by Virginia Intermont College, a liberal arts college in Bristol, Virginia.

== Coat of arms ==
The Coat of Arms of the State of Colorado as illustrated in 1876.

The Coat of Arms of the State of Colorado was implicitly defined by the legislation creating the Seal of the Territory of Colorado on November 11, 1861, and the Great Seal of the State of Colorado on March 15, 1877. It is seldom used, but maintained for historical interest.

== See also ==
- Flag of Colorado
- Bibliography of Colorado
- Geography of Colorado
- History of Colorado
- Index of Colorado-related articles
- List of Colorado-related lists
- Outline of Colorado
