= Flag of Colorado =

U.S. state flag

State of Colorado
- Use: Civil and state flag
- Proportion: 2:3
- Adopted: First adopted on June 5, 1911; 115 years ago Last revised on March 31, 1964; 62 years ago
- Design: Three horizontal stripes of blue, white, and blue. On top of these stripes sits a circular red "C", filled with a golden disk.
- Designed by: Andrew Carlisle Carson

The flag of the U.S. state of Colorado was officially adopted on June 5, 1911. The flag, designed by Andrew Carlisle Carson, (Note: Carson is sometimes erroneously referred to as "Andrew Carlisle Johnson".) consists of a fess design of three horizontal stripes of equal width, with the top and bottom stripes colored blue, and the middle stripe colored white. A circular red "C", filled with a golden disk, sits atop the stripes. All aspects of the flag contain symbolism related to the state, as the blue is meant to represent the sky, the gold the abundant sunshine the state receives, the white the snowcapped Rocky Mountains, and the red the "ruddy" earth. The gold and white portions of the flag also represent the state's gold and silver mining industries, respectively.

The state had one previous official flag before the current one, from 1907 to 1911. The Denver chapter of the Daughters of the American Revolution, unaware that this flag existed, wanted to create a flag for the state and settled on a red and white colored one, designed with the help of then-state senator William H. Sharpley. This flag was presented to the legislature but, because it was less popular than Carson's design, it was replaced. The new design passed the Senate and House of Representatives on April 25 and May 6, 1911, respectively. The flag made its public debut at a parade on May 30, 1911, and was officially adopted on June 5, 1911. Further revisions were made by the legislature on February 28, 1929, to specify the exact colors used and on March 31, 1964, to specify the size and positioning of the letter "C" and gold disk.

== Design and specifications ==
=== Statute ===
The Colorado Revised Statutes, § 24-80-904, defines that the flag shall consist of:

...three alternate stripes to be of equal width and at right angles to the staff, the two outer stripes to be blue of the same color as in the blue field of the national flag and the middle stripe to be white, the proportion of the flag being a width of two-thirds of its length. At a distance from the staff end of the flag of one-fifth of the total length of the flag there shall be a circular red C, of the same color as the red in the national flag of the United States. The diameter of the letter shall be two-thirds of the width of the flag. The inner line of the opening of the letter C shall be three-fourths of the width of its body or bar, and the outer line of the opening shall be double the length of the inner line thereof. Completely filling the open space inside the letter C shall be a golden disk; attached to the flag shall be a cord of gold and silver intertwined, with tassels one of gold and one of silver.

=== Symbolism ===
Within Senate Bill 118, which passed the Colorado Senate on May 6, 1911, ten specific points of symbolism within the flag were laid out. The red letter "C" stands for three things: the name of the state, "Colorado" (meaning "red" in Spanish, from the red earth of the State), the word "centennial", referring to Colorado's accession to statehood in 1876, the year of the United States' centennial; and "columbine", referring to the state flower. The gold disk in the center of the "C" represents not only the sunshine the state receives (which totals nearly 300 days annually), but also gold and the gold mining industry in the state. The blue stripes represent the sky, and the white stripes represent both the peaks of the Rocky Mountains and silver, as well as the resulting mining industry; the blue and white stripes together also represent the colors of the columbine flower. Other symbolism apart from the senate bill has been noted, including the red coloring of the "C" standing for the "ruddy" earth that covers much of the state's terrain.

== History ==
=== Pre-official flags ===
Flag of the 1st Battalion of the Colorado National Guard (obverse)

Following the organization of Colorado Territory as a United States territory on February 28, 1861, both 33-star and 34-star versions of the Stars and Stripes were commonly flown, with a contemporary source indicating that a proper arrangement of the stars was considered to be an arrangement in the shape of a five-pointed star.

From the 1870s on, Colorado militia and National Guard units carried blue regimental flags bearing the state coat of arms, including the Governor's Guard (1872), the first battalion (1882), and the First Colorado Volunteers, who carried theirs through the Spanish–American War. This followed standard U.S. Army practice of the time, which required regiments to carry such flags.

There were also flags used outside the military, representing the state itself. These were blue banners bearing the state coat of arms or seal. One represented Colorado at the 1892 World's Columbian Exposition. Though just one year later, in 1893, inquiry found the coat of arms had been "lost sight of" and had to be rediscovered. In 1898, a hand-sewn state banner was presented to Governor Adams for display in the capitol, and similar banners appeared at civic events through 1906.

=== State banner (1907–1911) ===
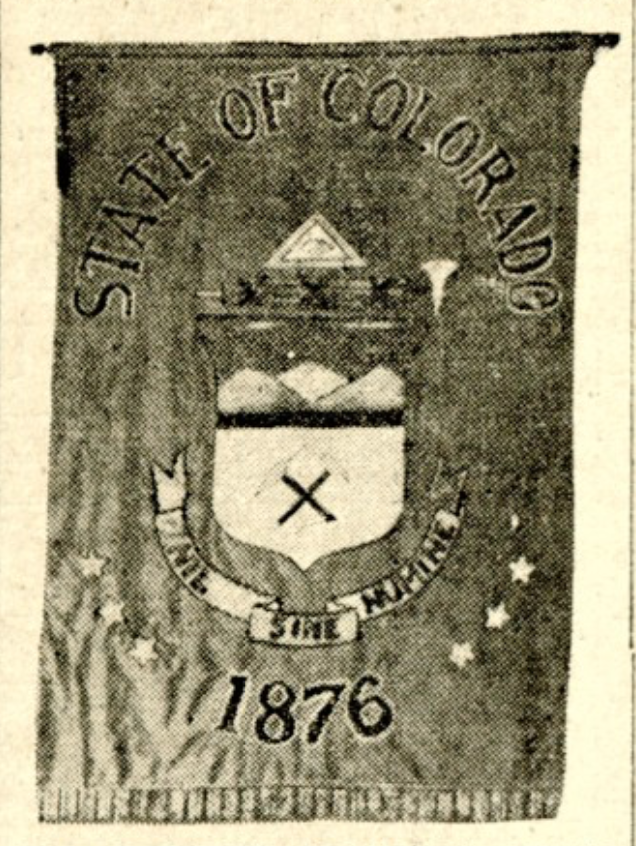
Colorado state banner (1907–1911)

A state banner was created by Senate Bill No. 155, introduced by Senators Lewis, Barela, and Anfenger, and approved on April 9, 1907. The act provided that the banner was to be used on occasions when the state was "officially and publicly represented" and specified that it would consist of the state coat of arms on a dark blue field, based on a model in the governor's office made by Mrs. J. J. Hagerman. The bill was drafted by the Denver chapter of the Daughters of the American Revolution. During the legislative process, the proposal faced some opposition from senators who questioned the need for a separate state emblem beyond the national colors.

Contemporary reports stated that the banner saw limited use, with only a small number of examples known to exist, including one in the governor's office and another at the Auditorium. Section 2 of the 1911 state flag act specifically repealed the 1907 state banner law.

=== Current flag (1911–present) ===
The D.A.R. flag committee's proposed design, December 1910.

Design described in Senator Sharpley's state flag bill, February 1911.

The origin of the modern flag of Colorado can be traced to a meeting of the Denver chapter of the Daughters of the American Revolution (DAR) held on November 14, 1910. Those present at the meeting were reportedly unaware of the banner that had been adopted three years earlier, and set out to design a flag for the state under the impression that none existed. The 1907 banner was, however, also considered "unsatisfactory," and the law establishing it was described as "faulty" and "defective." The DAR members, including Eurithe LaBarthe, formed a committee which was receiving designs by the next month, and decided to support one design that contained three horizontal stripes of red, white, and red, with the state seal in the middle. By February 1911, an alternate design featuring stripes of Yale blue and white running parallel to the staff was reported in the press as the version expected to pass the legislature. It was to be hoisted for the first time at an event held by the Ohio Society of Colorado. Then-state senator William H. Sharpley assisted in getting the flag bill through the legislature with relative ease, though the design ultimately proved unpopular.

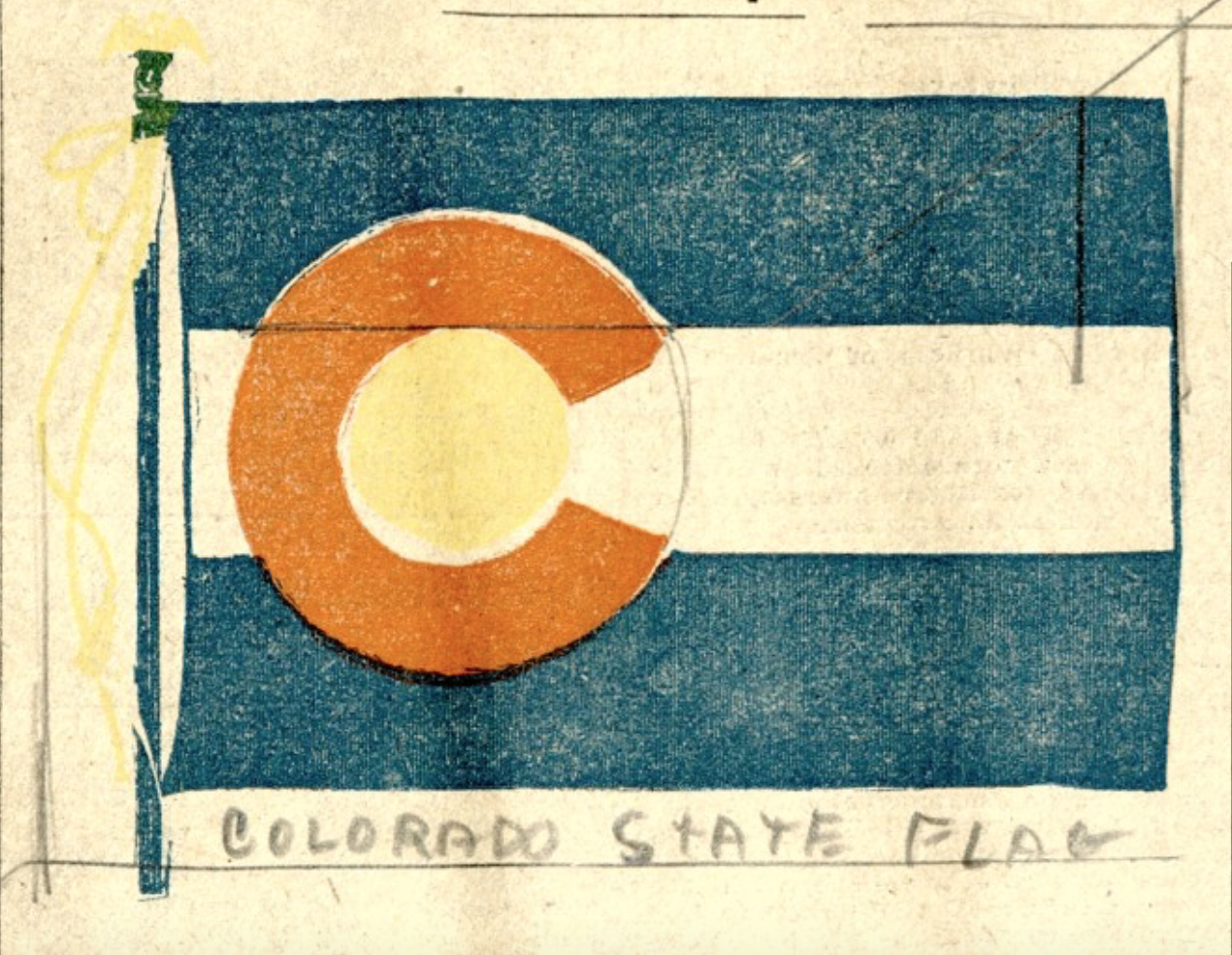
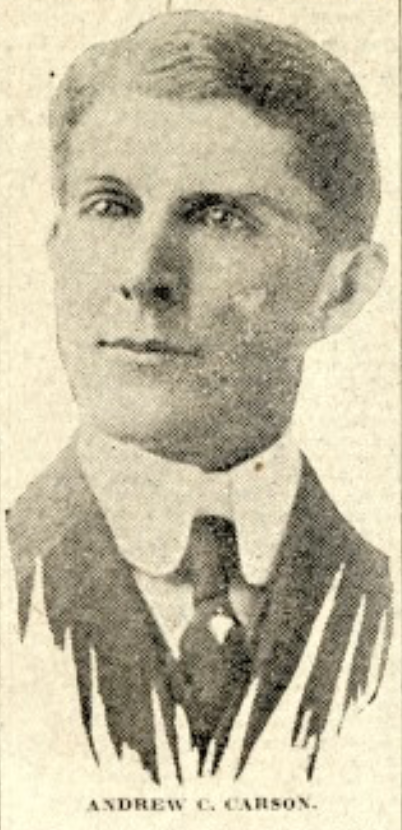
Andrew Carlisle Carson and an illustration of the state flag

A modified design was submitted by Andrew Carlisle Carson, President of the Ohio Society of Colorado. It featured horizontal stripes of blue, white, and blue, with a red "C" and a gold disk within the "C" both in the middle and offset slightly to the hoist side of the flag. The shade of blue, Yale blue, was later noted to also be a color of the D.A.R. This design proved far more popular among the legislature than the initial proposal, and passed the Colorado Senate as Senate Bill 118 with "no opposition" on April 25, 1911. The bill was sent to the Colorado House of Representatives and passed easily on May 6, 1911. The flag made its public debut at the end of that month, on May 30, as a part of a Grand Army of the Republic parade, and was officially approved by the General Assembly as a whole on June 5, 1911, at which point it became the new flag of the state of Colorado. The wording of the bill that was passed included a permission for the use of the flag by all citizens, meaning the design could be used on items that were not explicitly flags.

Variant state flag, 1911–1964

Variant state flag with the circular red "C", filled with a golden disk more to the left.

However, the legislature did not specify the size of the "C" or the exact shade of blue or red. Therefore, some flags utilized slightly different colors. On February 28, 1929, the General Assembly added to the description of the flag that the blue and red would be the same colors as those found on the national flag. Further discrepancies arose in the size of the "C" and gold disk – some designs had the "C" wholly within the center stripe, while some had the "C" over parts of each blue stripe. To resolve this, on March 31, 1964, the legislature further dictated the diameter of the gold disc to be equal to the width of the center stripe. This final clarification brought about the design that is in use today.

In 1911, they started production of the largest state flag ever made. The flag measured around 70 feet wide and 140 feet long.

In 1920, the DAR publicly stated that the state should change the state flag from the current design to one with a state seal.

In a 2001 survey of 72 state, provincial, and territorial flags conducted by the North American Vexillological Association, Colorado's flag was ranked sixteenth, with a score of 6.83 (the winner, New Mexico, scored 8.61).

=== Other flags ===
In 1914, the USS Denver carried the Governor Ammons and the Panama-Pacific Exposition Committee through the Panama canal on their way to San Francisco. The ship flew a modified state flag with the inscription "Denver" added to it.

In 1918, during World War 1, the 351st field artillery of the Colorado National guard carried a unique state flag. The flag was described as bearing the state seal in the center with the inscription "Colorado."

In 1923 the USS Colorado was given 5 flags from the state. One of the flags was described as containing the state's seal in its field.

==== Image gallery ====
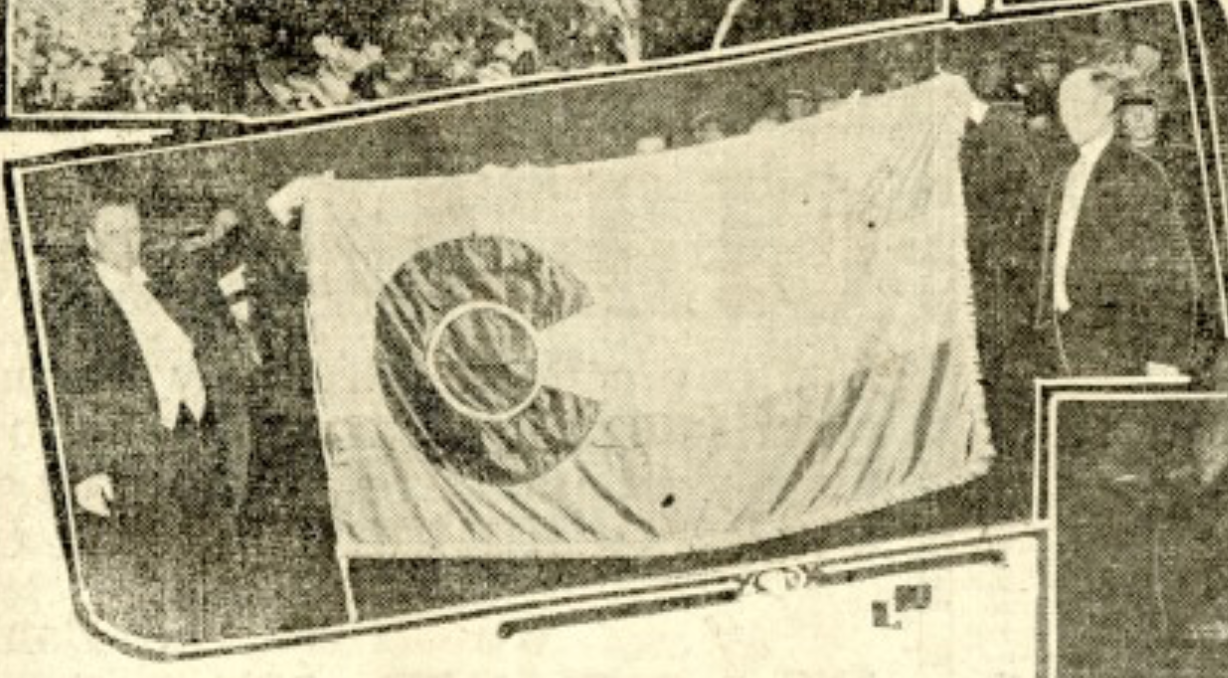
State flag from 1915

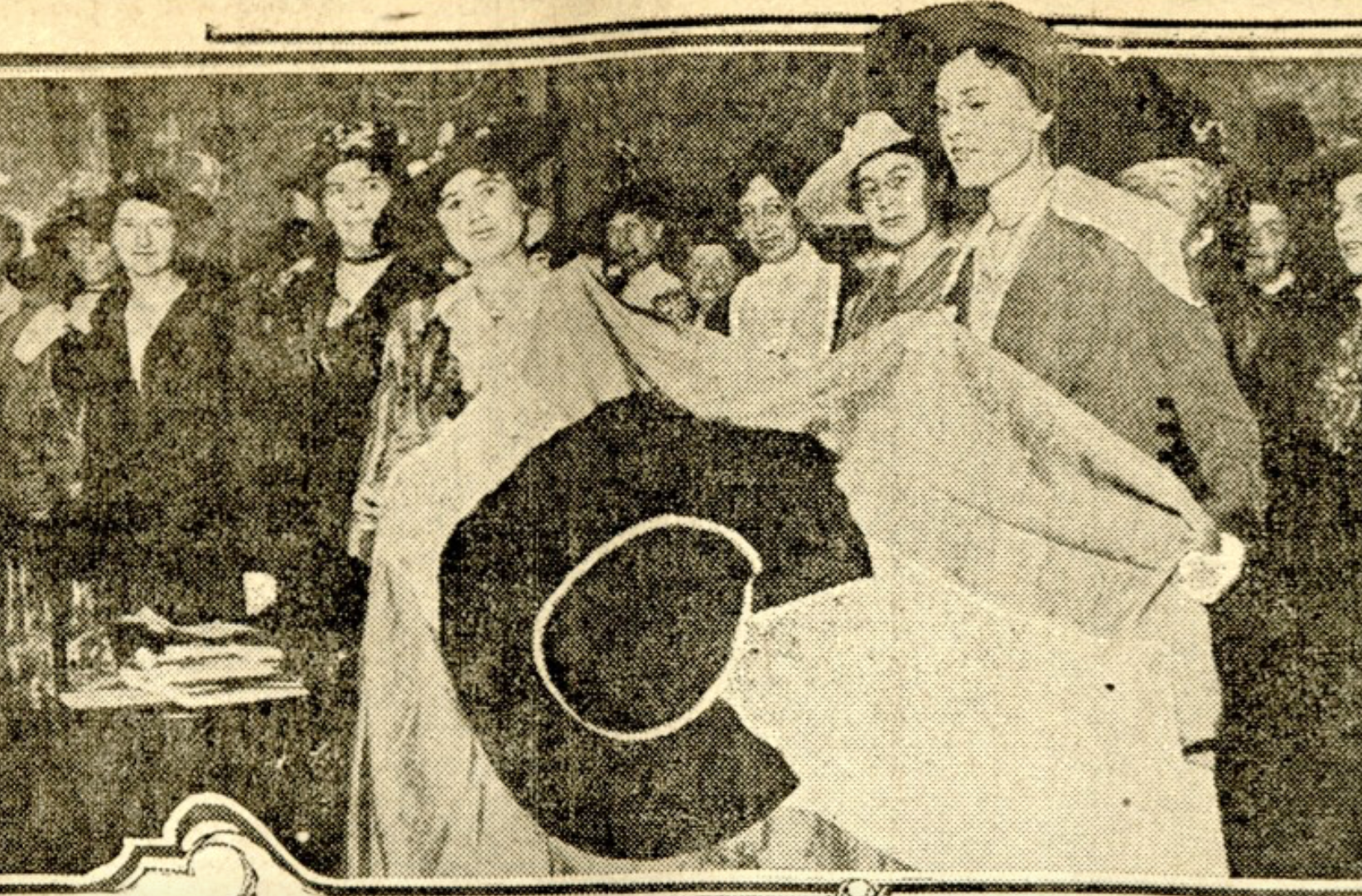
State flag from 1916

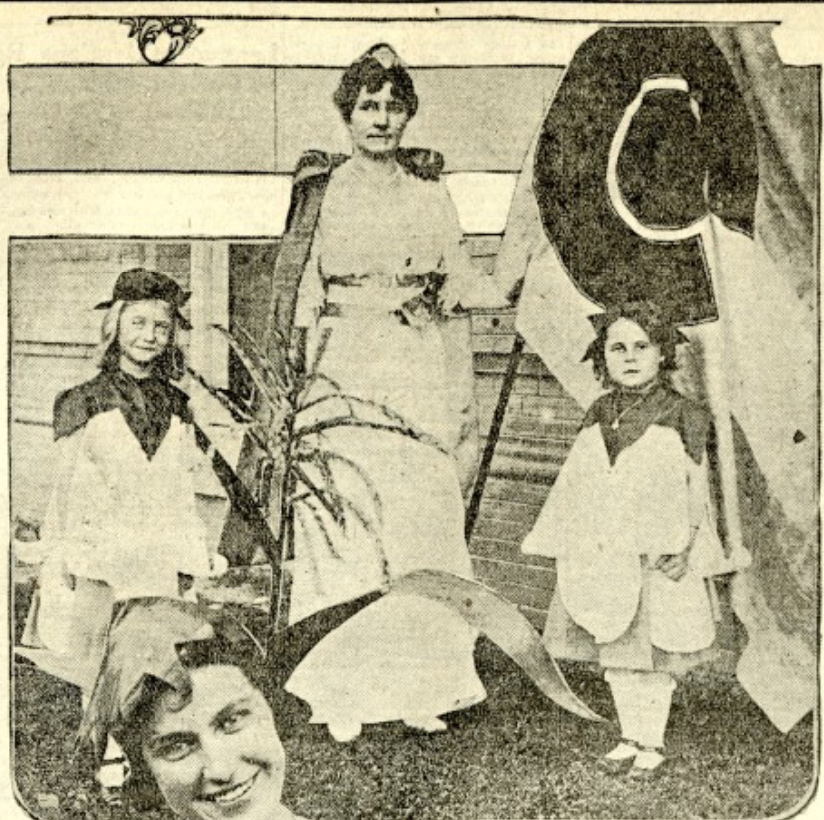
State flag from 1920

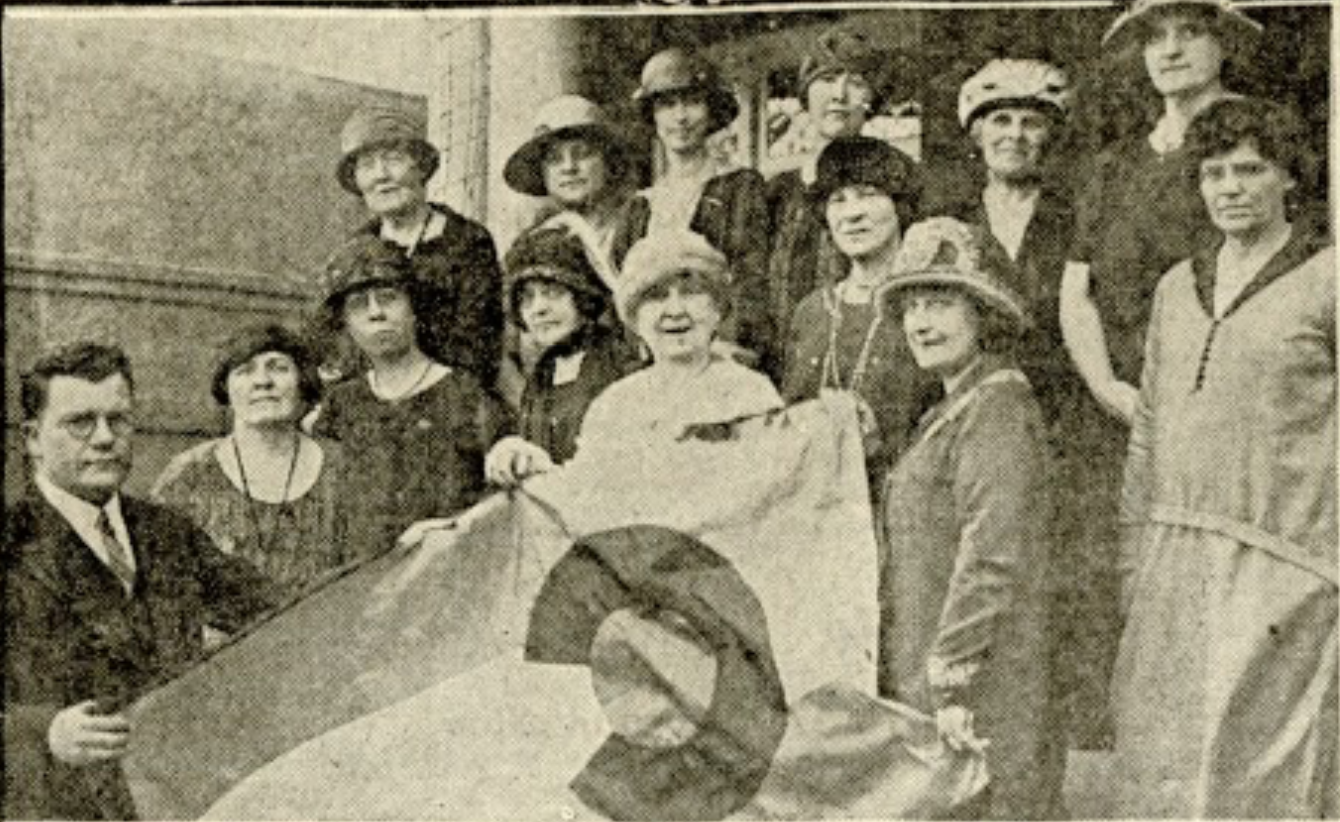
State flag from 1926

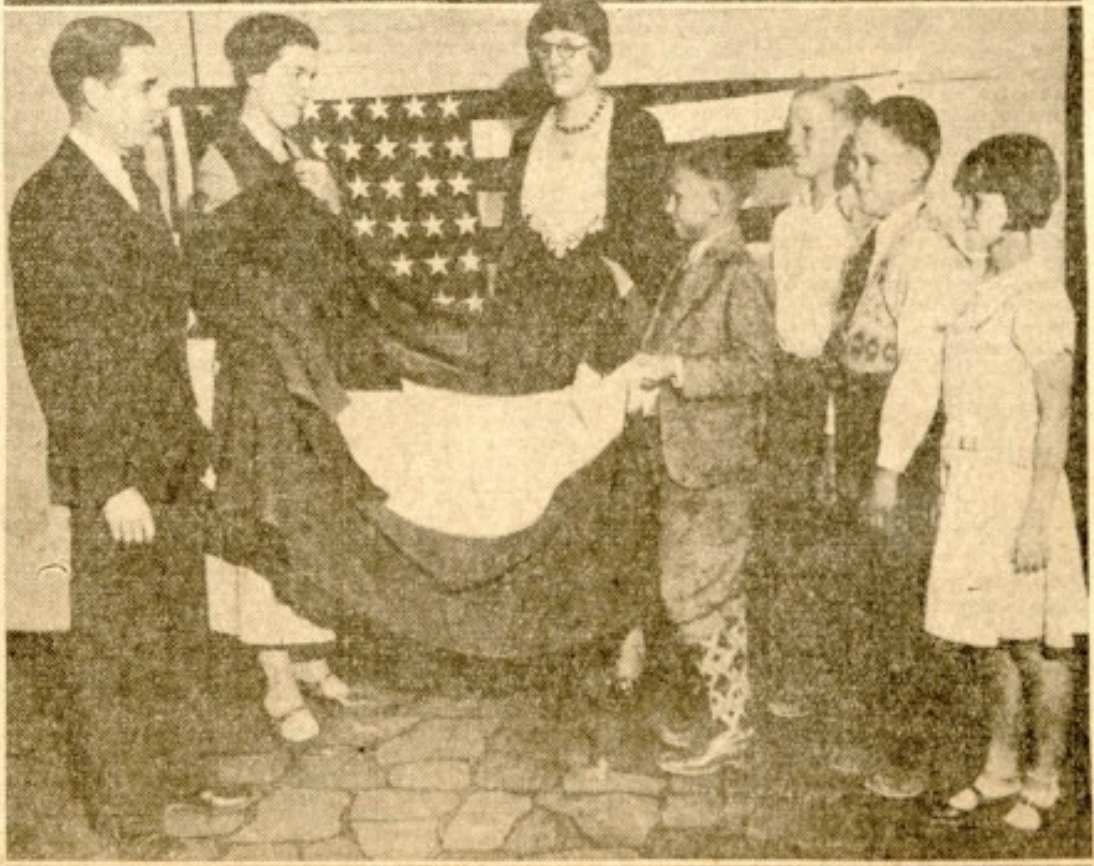
State flag from 1931

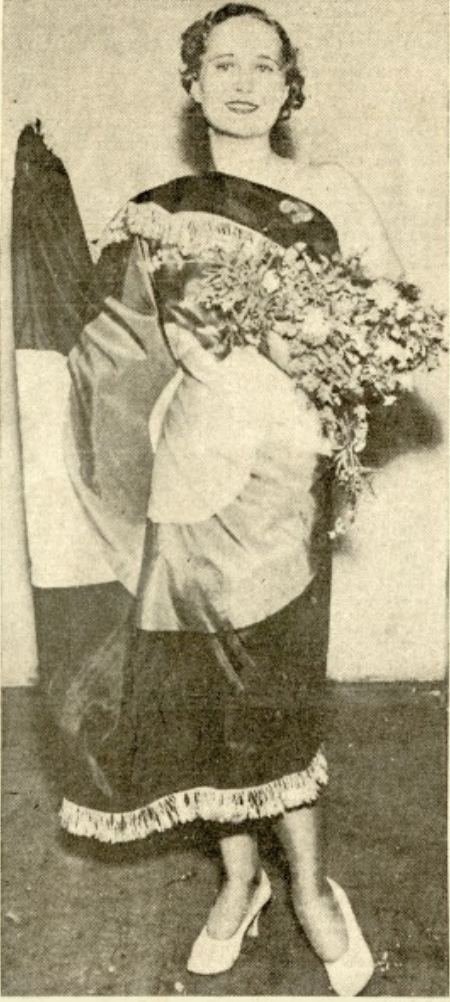
State flag from 1935

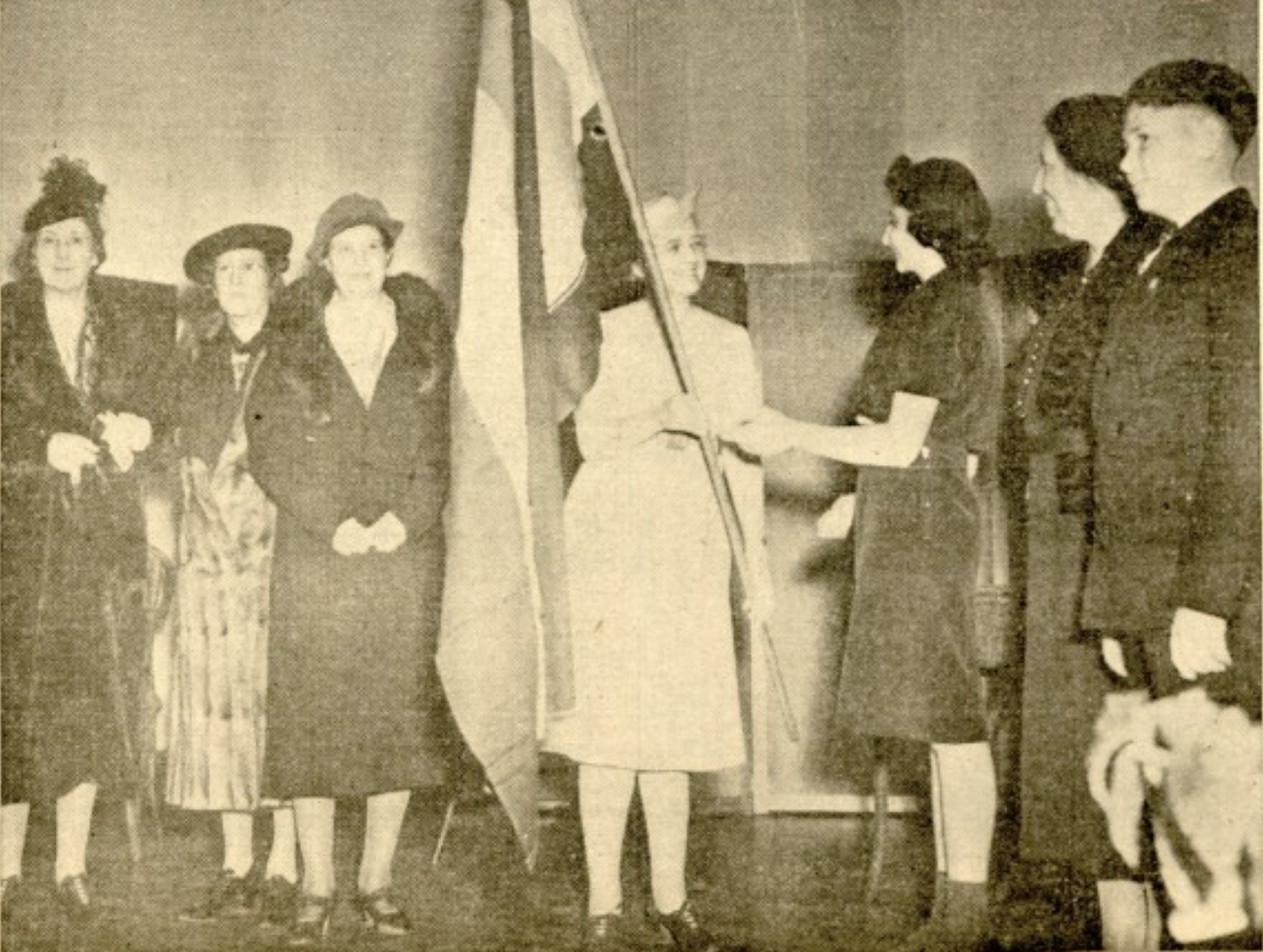
State flag from 1939

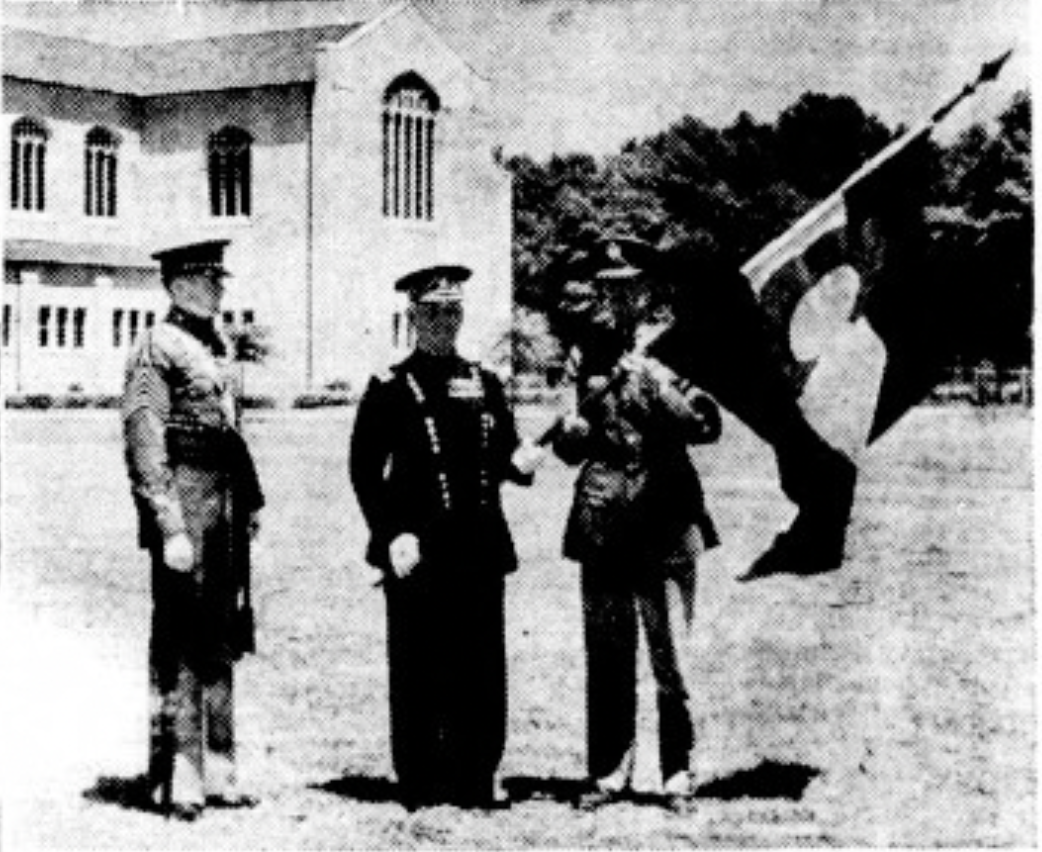
State flag from 1940

== Protocol ==
The state of Colorado and the office of the governor have laid out rules as to when the flag can be flown at half-staff and protocol for various other situations. The governor may order the flag lowered to half-staff, along with the national flag, on the day of the funeral of a Colorado service member, at the request of the president (usually for the death of a federal government official or a national tragedy), or on the day of the funeral of a state government official. The flag is always to be lowered to half-staff on three holidays: Memorial Day (though the flags are raised to full-staff at noon, a custom dating back to at least 1906), September 11, and National Pearl Harbor Remembrance Day. The governor also has the jurisdiction to order the flag lowered when it is "deemed appropriate". The flag is always to be flown to the right and below the national flag, a guideline specified by the United States Flag Code.

State law mandates that government buildings and schools maintain a "suitable" flagpole for both the national and state flags, and that the flags must be the same size.

== Other uses ==
An example of a Colorado state highway sign

The state flag is also incorporated into the design of Colorado's state highway markers, though some markers use a representation of the flag that differs slightly from the official version, namely one in which the red letter "C" does not extend into the white stripe and is cut off at the border of the blue stripes instead. The flag is also used as an inspiration behind Colorado's newest state logo, which was unveiled in March 2019.

The Colorado Rapids, who compete in Major League Soccer and play in the Denver area, played in an alternate kit for part of the 2017 season with colors inspired by the state flag: the top was yellow with blue accents, and the shorts were blue with yellow accents.

The Colorado Rockies, who played in the National Hockey League from 1976–82 before moving to New Jersey and renaming themselves the New Jersey Devils, used the flag's colors and emblem on their uniforms.

The courthouse in Mesa County, Colorado, made headlines in 2007 when county commissioners realized its flagpole was flying only the national flag, making it one of the few government buildings in the state that did not fly the state flag, though no reason was given for the state flag's absence. The flag enjoyed renewed popularity during the 2010s, with shirts, decals, and other items incorporating the design seeing increased demand.

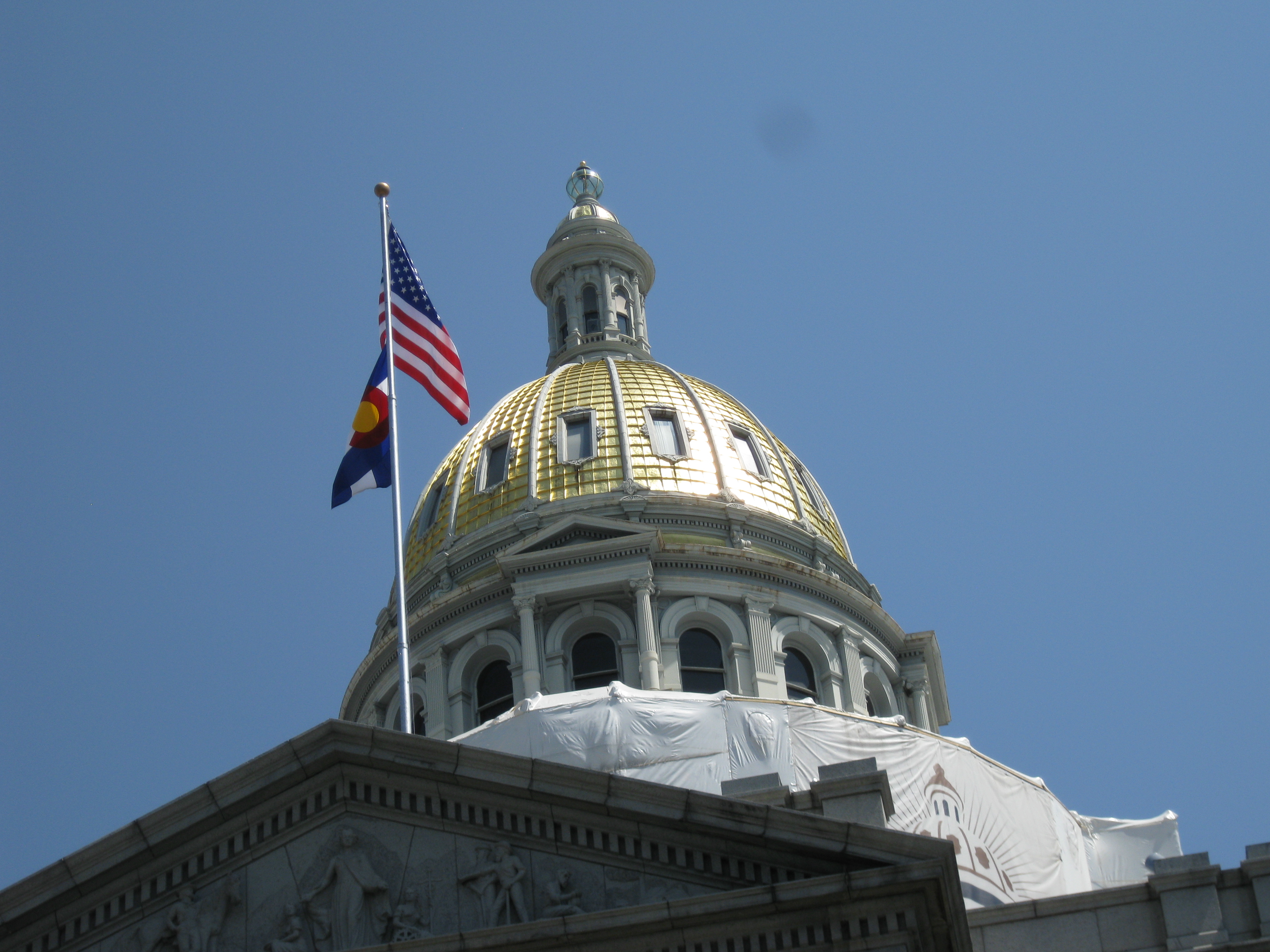
The state flag flying under the national flag at the Colorado State Capitol

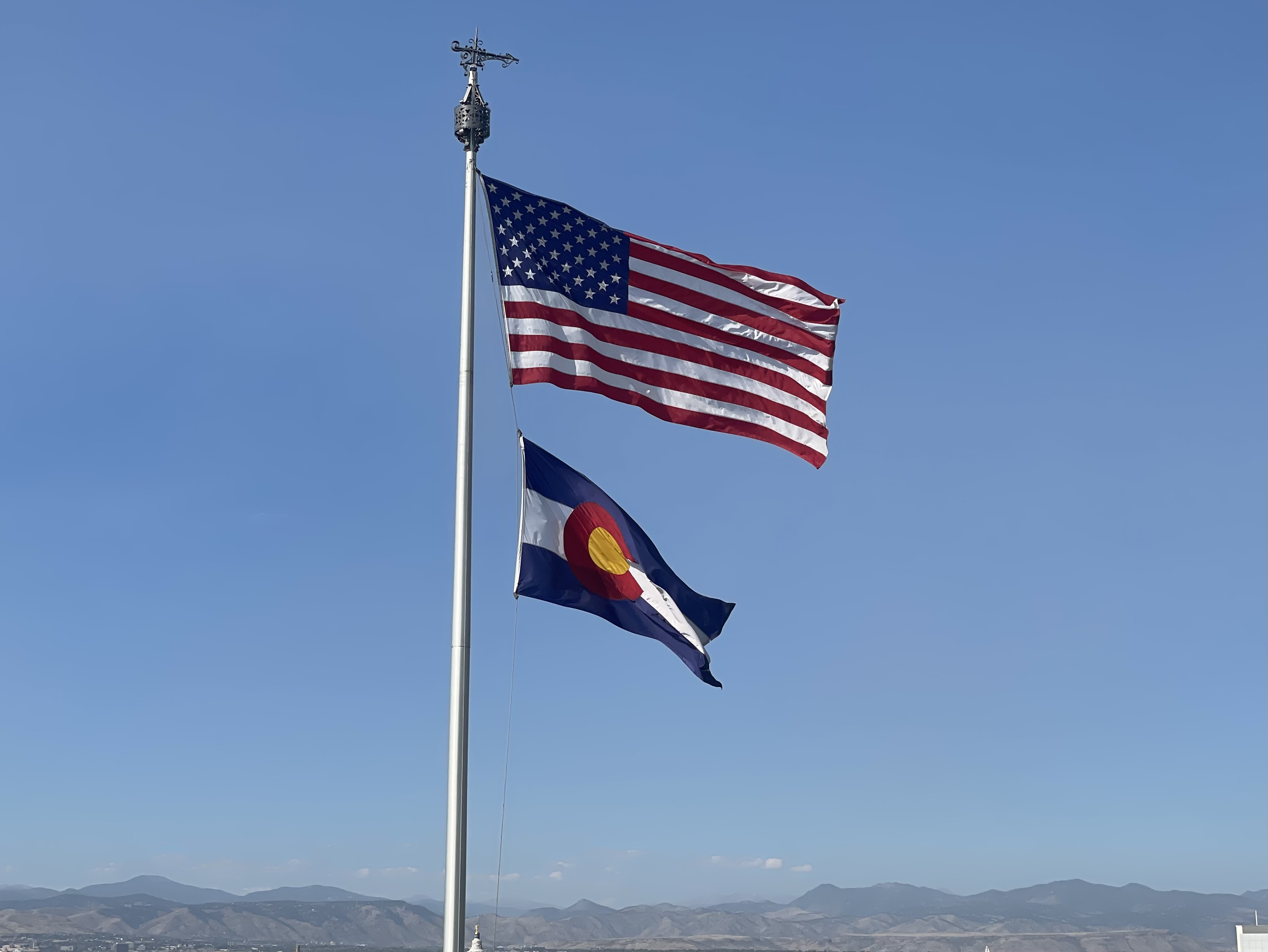
The national and state flags over the Colorado State Capitol

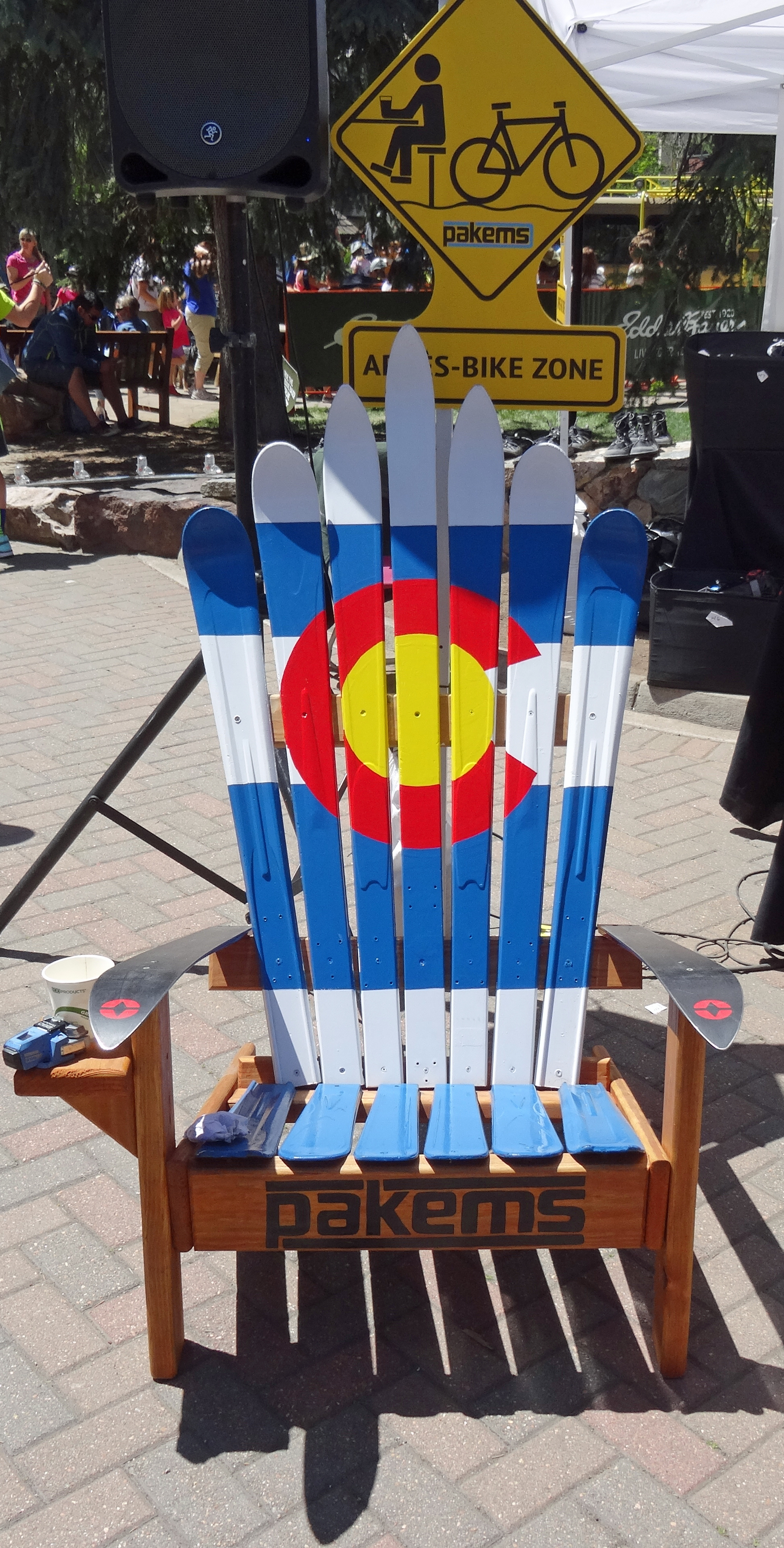
An Adirondack chair in Vail with a state flag design

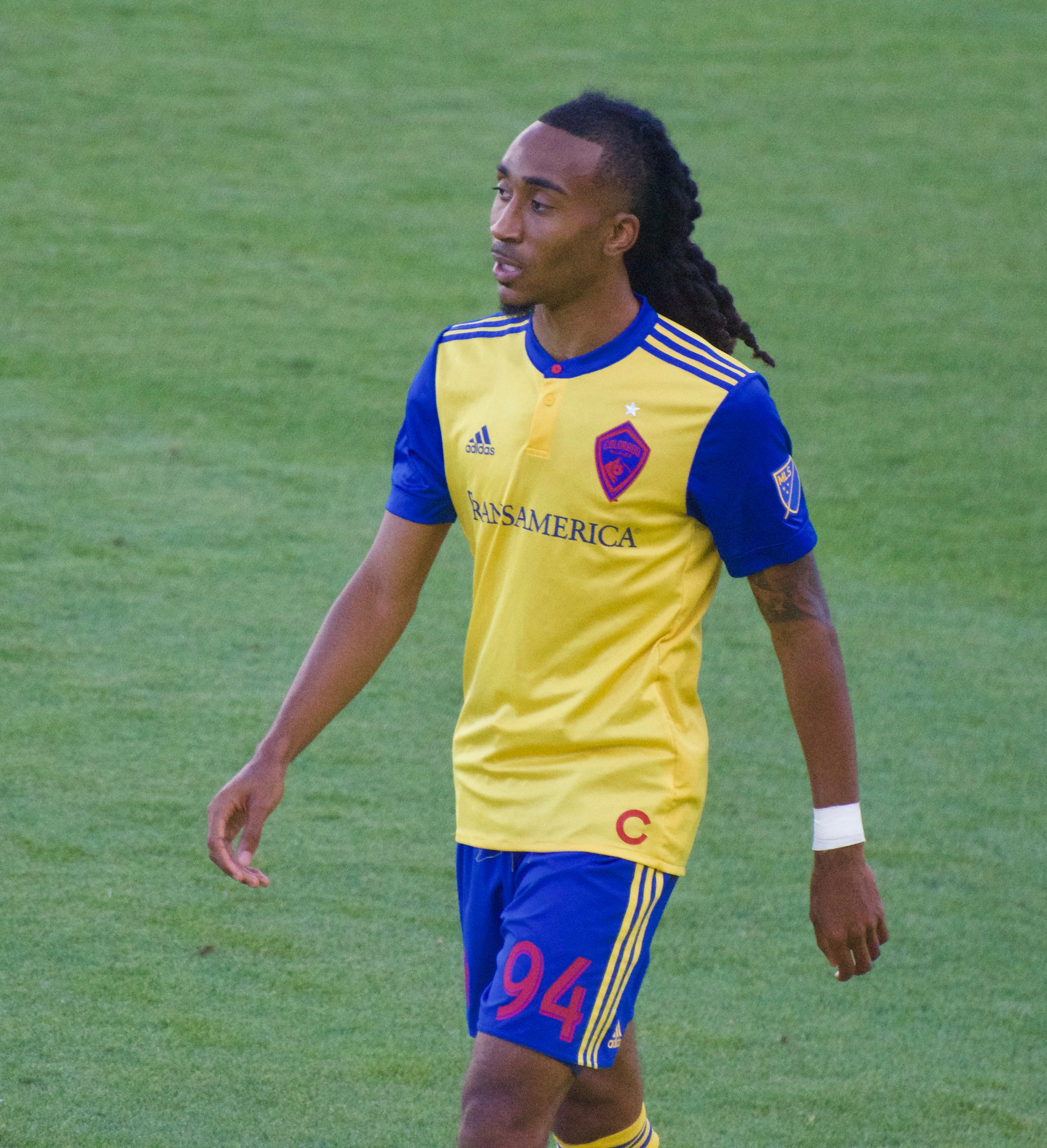
The Colorado Rapids' alternate kit with a flag-inspired color scheme

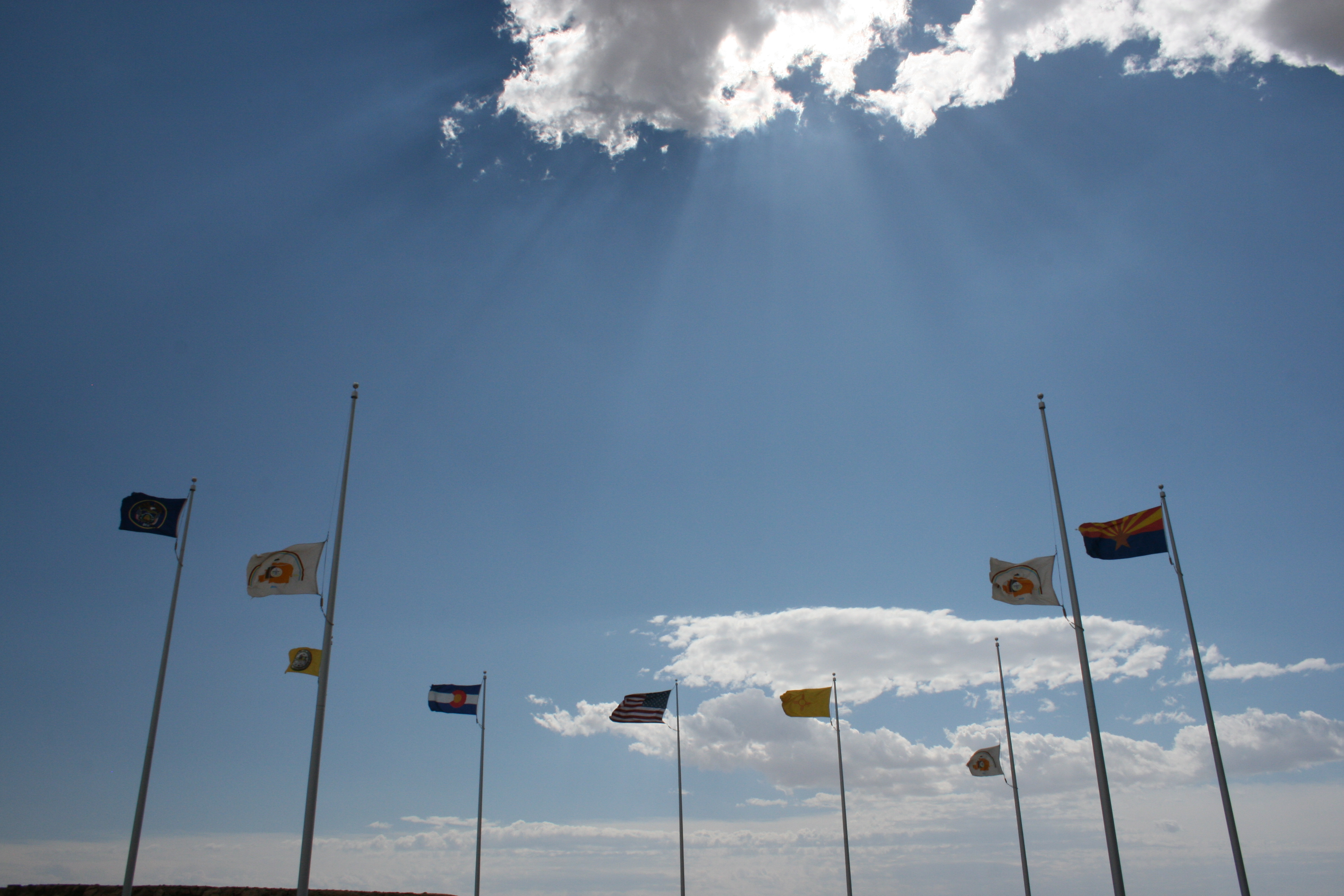
The flag of Colorado (third pole from left) alongside others at the Four Corners Monument

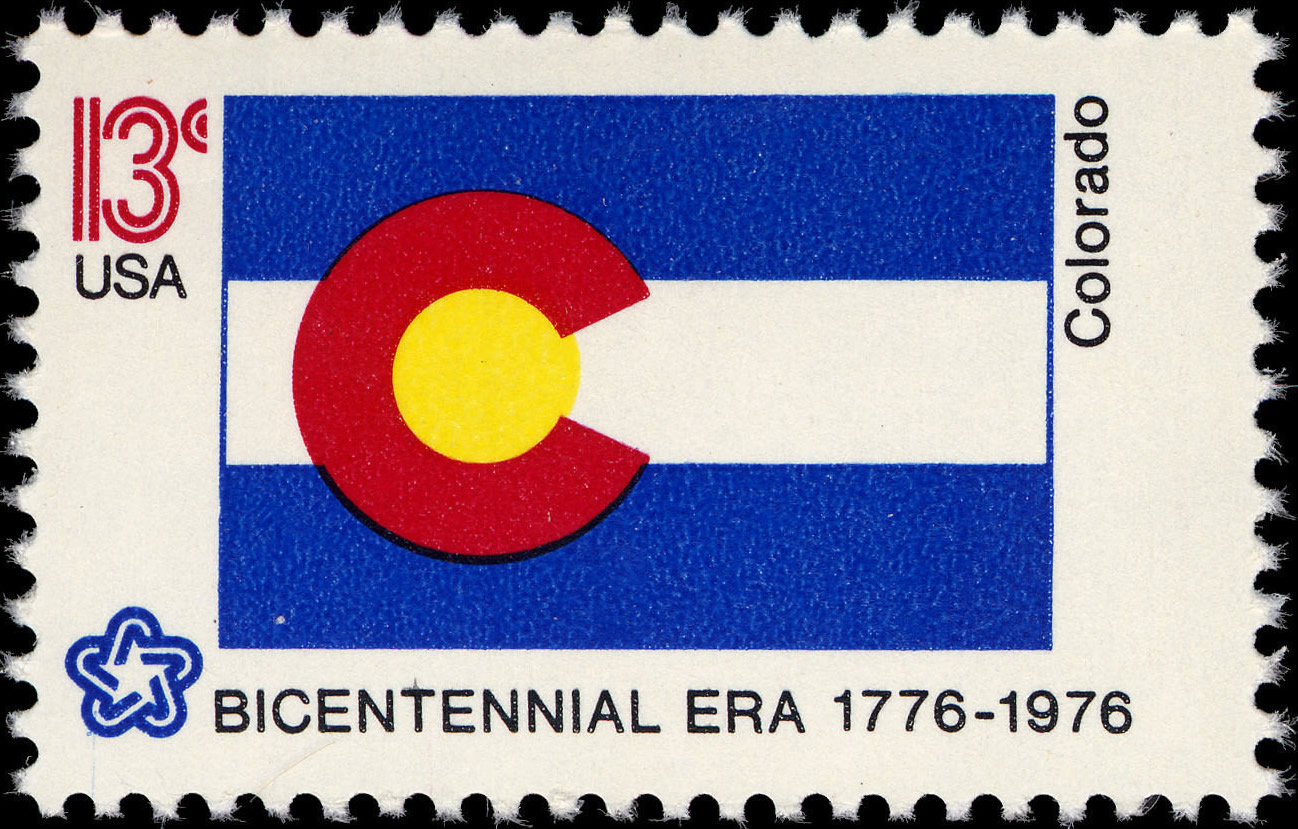
The Colorado state flag as depicted in the 1976 bicentennial postage stamp series

== See also ==
- List of Colorado state symbols
