= List of botanical gardens and arboretums in Colorado =

Coordinates: 38.9972°N 105.5478°W

The location of the State of Colorado in the United States of America.

This list of botanical gardens and arboretums in Colorado is intended to include all significant botanical gardens and arboretums in the U.S. state of Colorado

== Table ==
Name	Image	Affiliation	City
Chester M. Alter Arboretum		University of Denver	Denver
Andrews Arboretum			Boulder
Denver Botanic Gardens			Denver
Betty Ford Alpine Gardens			Vail
Gardens on Spring Creek		City of Fort Collins	Fort Collins
Hudson Gardens			Littleton
Montrose Botanic Gardens			Montrose
Shambhala Botanic Gardens			Red Feather Lakes
Western Colorado Botanical Gardens			Grand Junction
Yampa River Botanic Park			Steamboat Springs

== See also ==
- List of botanical gardens and arboretums in the United States
- Bibliography of Colorado
- Geography of Colorado
- History of Colorado
- Index of Colorado-related articles
- List of Colorado-related lists
- Outline of Colorado
