= Christian Science Society =

Christian Science Society may refer to:

- Christian Science Society (Nanaimo), British Columbia, Canada
- Christian Science Society (Steamboat Springs, Colorado)
- Christian Science Society (Grinnell, Iowa)
- Christian Science Society (Cape May, New Jersey)
- Christian Science Society (Oconto, Wisconsin)
