= Christian Science Society (Steamboat Springs, Colorado) =

Historic church in Colorado, United States

- Christian Science Society Building
- U.S. National Register of Historic Places
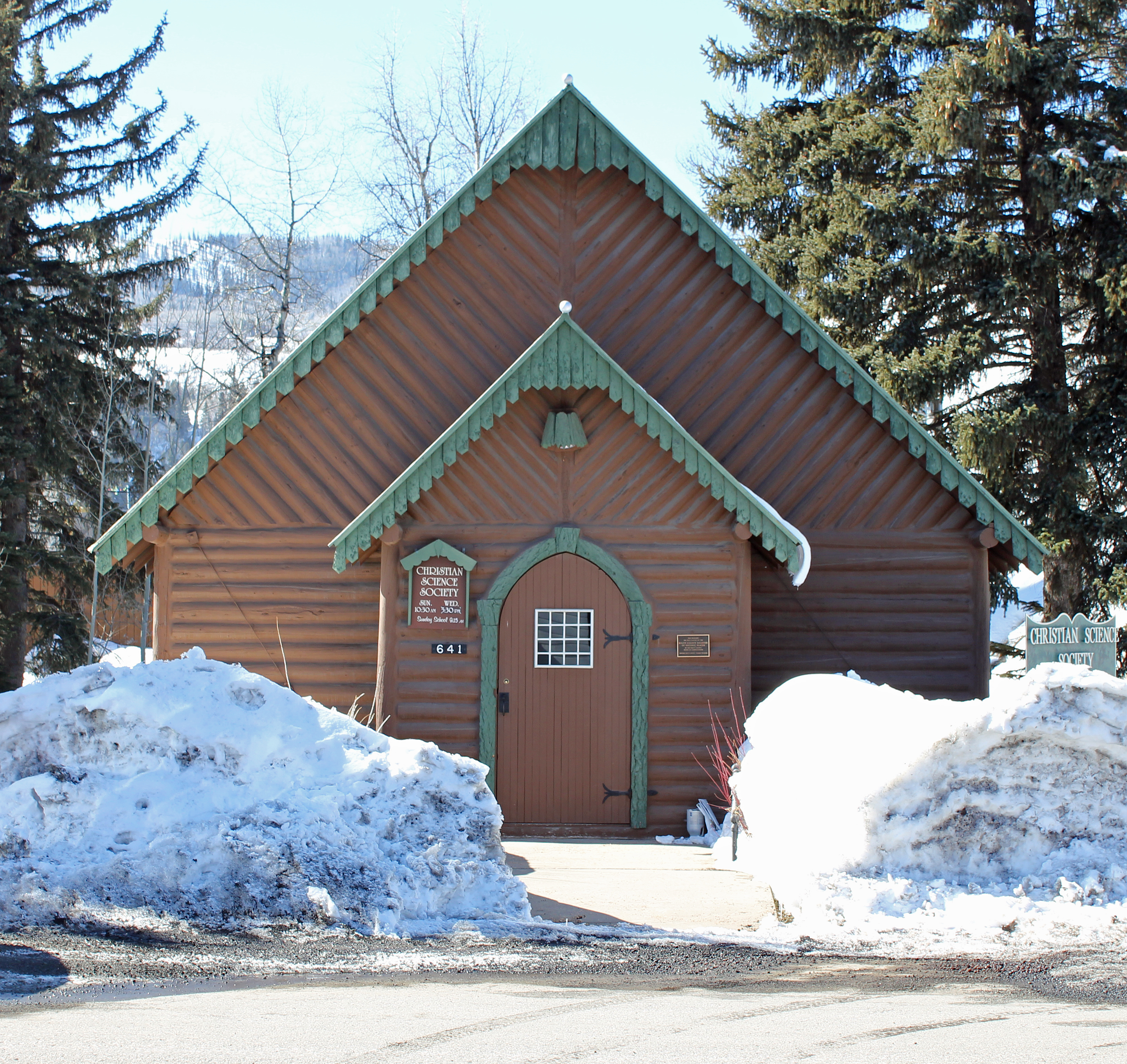

- Location within Colorado Location within the United States
- Location: 641 Oak St., Steamboat Springs, Colorado
- Coordinates: 40°29′10″N 106°49′55″W
- Area: less than one acre
- Built: 1934
- Architect: Ernest Campbell
- Architectural style: Late 19th And Early 20th Century American Movements, Rustic
- NRHP reference No.: 07000839
- Added to NRHP: August 22, 2007

Christian Science Society, Steamboat Springs is an historic Christian Science church located at 641 Oak Street corner of 7th Street in Steamboat Springs, Routt County, Colorado; Built in 1934 of logs on a rubble rock foundation with a shingle roof, it was designed and constructed by local builder Ernest Campbell in the style of architecture that has come to be known as the Rustic style. The society was organized on July 22, 1908, by local Christian Scientists, notable among whom was Margaret E. Crawford, who with her husband, James Harvey Crawford, had founded and named Steamboat Springs in 1875. It met at various local sites until November 4, 1934 when the first service was held in its new building. The building site purchased in 1920 had formerly been occupied by the Onyx Hotel. Christian Science churches and societies are not dedicated until they are free of debt and the Steamboat Springs society was dedicated on December 15, 1935. Regular services have been held ever since. The only significant changes in the building since 1934 have been replacing the roof with a metal one to allow snow to slide off and dropping the interior ceiling for better insulation. The side walls have also been stabilized by running several metal rods between them. On August 22, 2007, the building was added to the National Register of Historic Places.
