= Crawford House (Steamboat Springs, Colorado) =

Historic house in Colorado, United States

- Crawford House Building
- U.S. National Register of Historic Places
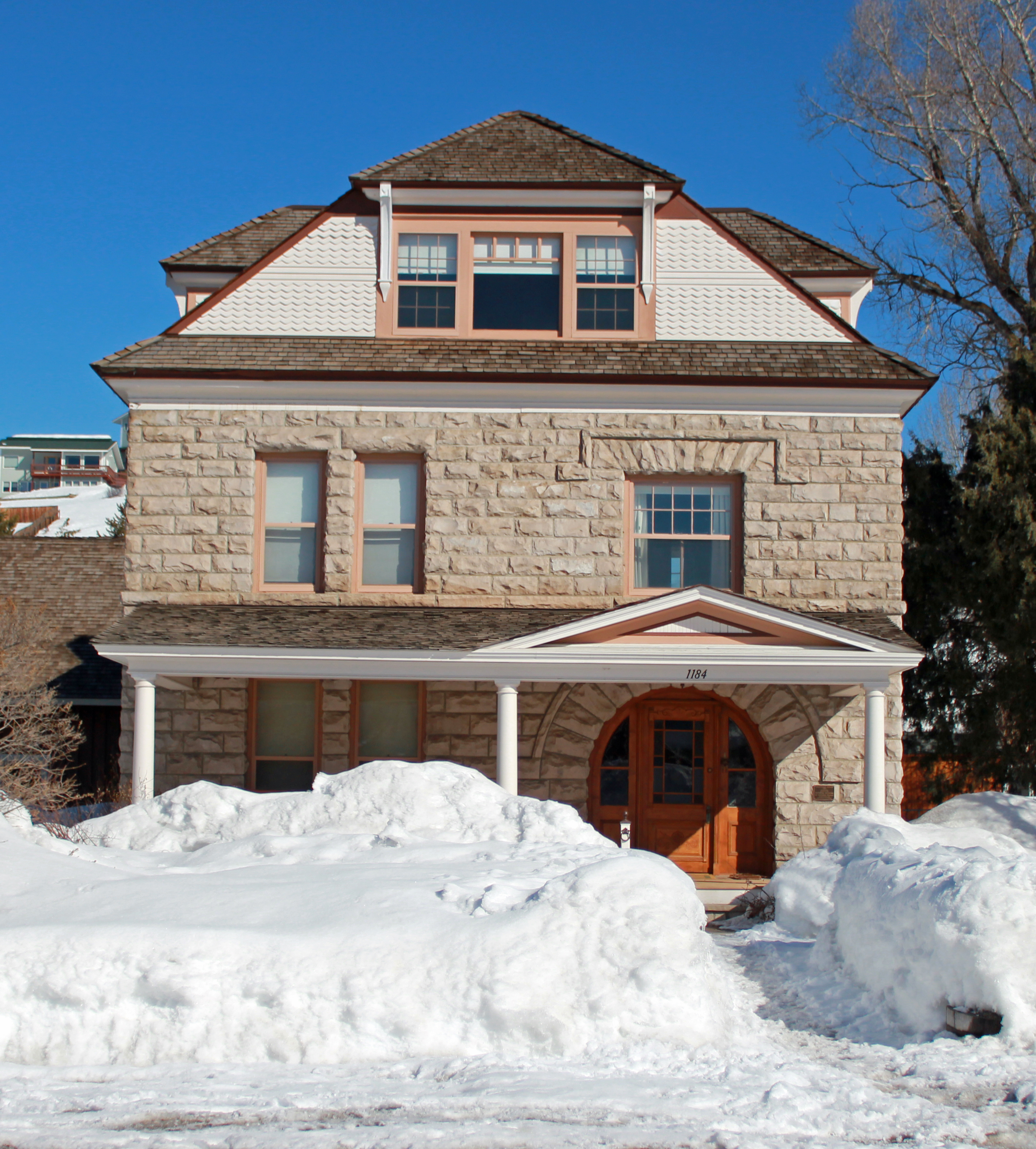

- Location within Colorado Location within the United States
- Location: 1184 Crawford Ave., Steamboat Springs, Colorado
- Coordinates: 40°29′27″N 106°50′14″W
- Area: .35 acres (0.14 ha)
- Built: 1894
- Built by: Charles Briggs
- Architectural style: residential Romanesque Revival
- NRHP reference No.: 05000782
- Added to NRHP: August 7, 2005

The Crawford House is a building in Steamboat Springs, Colorado, USA, that is listed on the National Register of Historic Places for its importance as the primary residence for 36 years of James Harvey Crawford, the Father of Steamboat Springs, and his wife, Margaret Emerine (Bourn) Crawford, the Mother of Routt County. The two of them together were among the most influential pioneering families in northwest Colorado. The Crawford House is also listed as a rare local example of residential Romanesque Revival architecture.

== Description ==
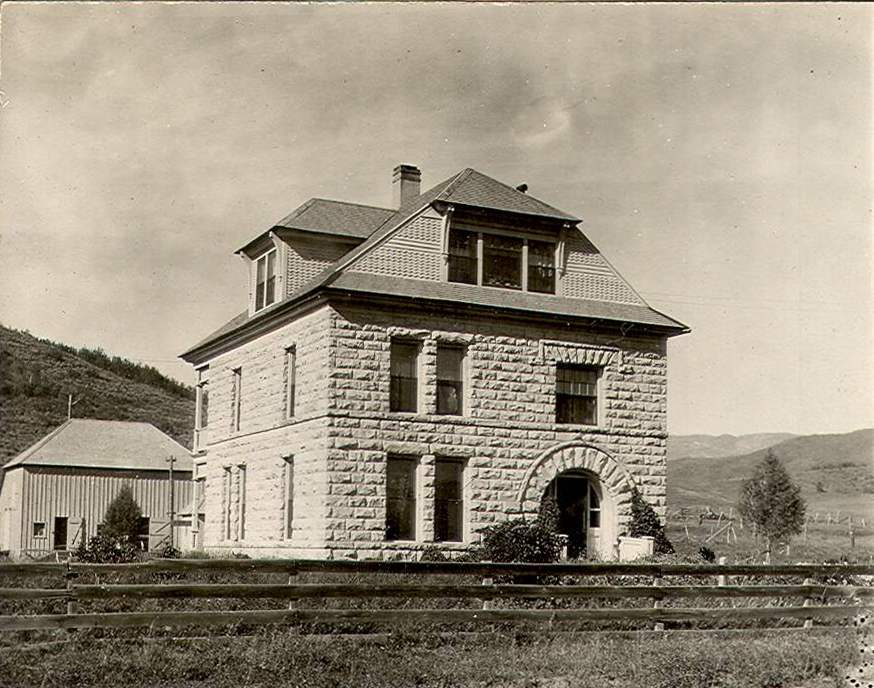
The Crawford House shortly after it was built. Note the original house did not have a porch. Smaller structure in back was the barn for the house.

The Crawford House was begun in 1893 by mason Charles Briggs. The stone initially came from Woodchuck Hill, but when a soft spot was encountered the rest of the stone came from the quarry at the southern end of Blackmer Drive on Emerald Mountain. 5,000 stones were used to build the Crawford House, but only 1675 are visible from the outside. There is a double wall of stones 18” thick with a 2” gap between the outer, decorative wall and the inner structural wall. There is also a foundation of stones starting seven feet underground. The house was also built with wood from local sawmills and brick from the local brickyard. Only small amounts of materials, such as the carved front door, were shipped from Denver.

With its use of stone for the first two stories of the house and a semi-circular arch over the front door opening, the Crawford House is a rare local example of Romanesque Revival residential architecture. The style was more commonly used in churches and large institutional buildings during the latter half of the 19th century, but was seldom used in residences. The house is also an example of the Foursquare style, displaying a simple square plan with 2 1/2 stories, hipped roof, large central dormer, roof overhang, and unadorned exterior. The Colonial Revival-style porch was added sometime in the 1910s and became a favorite spot for the Crawfords to sit and chat.

== James and Margaret Crawford ==
The Crawford House was the primary residence of James Harvey Crawford, the "Father of Steamboat Springs", and his wife, Margaret Emerine (Bourn) Crawford, the "Mother of Routt County." James first saw the Yampa River in the Spring of 1874. He staked his 160-acre homestead claim centered around the Steamboat Spring. In 1876, the Crawford family with their three small children built a cabin near the present intersection of 12th and Lincoln and became the first permanent settlers in the area. The Crawford cabin became the center of a growing community. It was the first post office, newspaper office, school, church, and library. The Governor appointed James as the first County Judge (1877), the first Postmaster (1878), and the first School Superintendent (1879). He was twice elected to represent Routt County in the Colorado legislature (1879 and 1887), and once elected as County Judge (1883). In 1884 Margaret helped organize the non-denominational Union Church that was the first church building in the county. Also in 1884, James organized the Steamboat Springs Town Company with financial backing of investors from Boulder. The company laid out the town, sold lots, built a bathhouse, and promoted the town. When incorporated in 1900, James was the first mayor of Steamboat Springs. James supported the family by raising several hundred head of cattle and horses, the first stockman in Steamboat Springs. He also discovered a large coal deposit leading to the Elkhead Anthracite Coal Company, and the largest onyx mine in Colorado, leading to the Colorado Onyx Company. Throughout their lives, the Crawfords welcomed one and all to visit and spend the night, and their homes were always the social hub of the community. They lived in this house over 40 years: James died in 1930 and Margaret in 1939.

The Crawford House was listed on the National Register of Historic Places on August 7, 2005.
