= James Harvey Crawford =

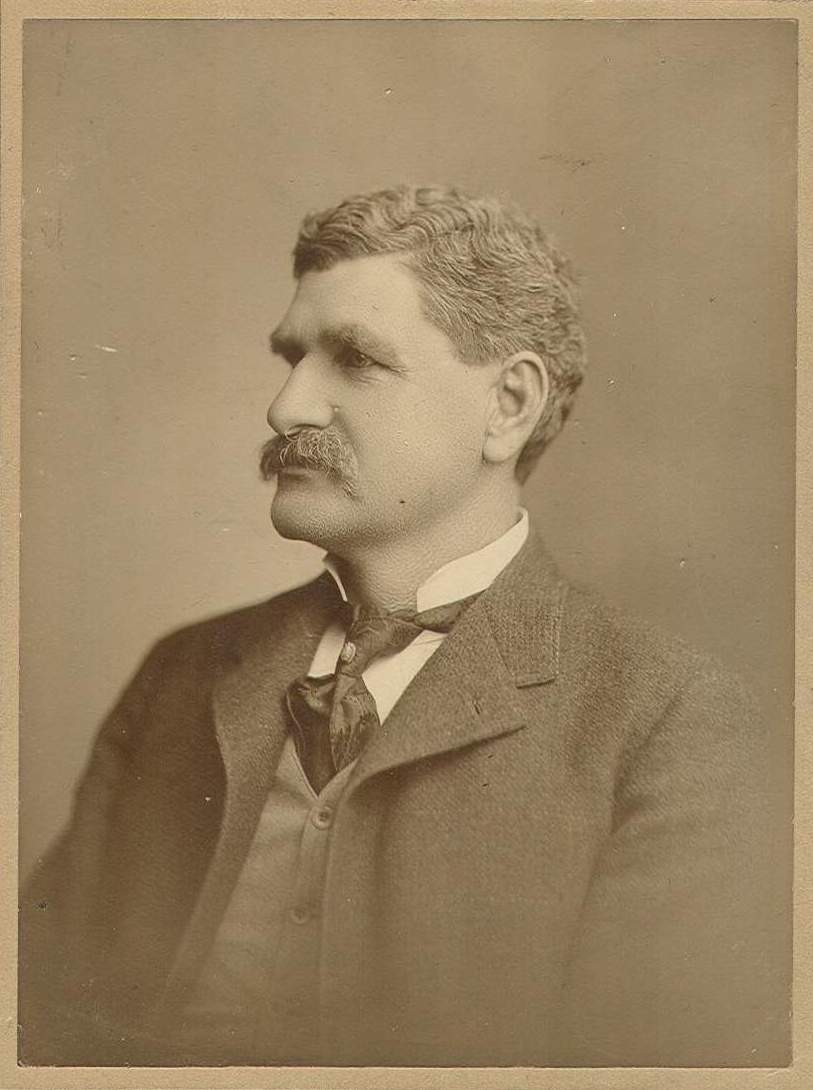
- James H. Crawford in 1902
- Born: March 30, 1845; Near Sedalia, Missouri
- Died: June 24, 1930 (aged 85); Steamboat Springs, Colorado
- Other name: Father of Steamboat Springs
- Occupations: Soldier, farmer, pioneer, cattleman, miner, land developer, and politician
- Known for: Founded Steamboat Springs
- Spouse: Margaret Emerine Crawford
- Military career
- Allegiance: United States
- Branch: Union Army
- Rank: First Lieutenant
- Units: 7th Missouri State Militia Cavalry, Company E
- Conflicts: American Civil War

James Harvey Crawford (1845-1930) was the founder of Steamboat Springs, Colorado. He was a man of many vocations: soldier, farmer, pioneer, cattleman, miner, land developer, and politician. He was called the "Father of Steamboat Springs", and his wife Margaret Emerine Crawford was called the "Mother of Routt County".

Sandra Dallas wrote in Gaslights and Gingerbread, "American tradition likes to believe the West was settled by honest brave men, not by greedy, grubbing miners as it often was, but by men with a vision, pioneers with a dream. Steamboat Springs was founded by just such a man, James H. Crawford."

== Early life in Missouri ==
James Harvey Crawford was born March 30, 1845, on his father John Edward Crawford's farm along Spring Fork Creek, six miles south of the present town of Sedalia, Missouri. His future wife, Margaret Emerine Bourn, lived on the adjacent farm. James enlisted in the Union Army, Company E, 7th Missouri State Militia Cavalry, on February 10, 1862, while only 16. He was promoted to Second Sergeant on April 12 and to First Lieutenant on November 8. During the Civil War, he served briefly in both Arkansas and Kansas, but spent most of the time in central and southern Missouri. On May 25, 1865, one month after he was mustered out of service, James and Margaret married. They bought land near their parents' farms, and for seven years led the quiet life of farmers. Three of their four children were born on the farm: Lulie on March 25, 1867, Logan on September 9, 1869, and John on February 8, 1873 (their fourth child Mary was born on March 27, 1882, in Boulder, Colorado).

== Pioneering in Colorado ==
In 1872 James made an exploratory trip to Colorado, where he traveled with Robert W. Steele, who was the first provisional governor of Colorado Territory from 1859 to 1861. Based on this trip, James sold his farm and in May 1873 he packed his family and belongings onto two wagons and led a small wagon train of friends along the Smoky Hill Trail across the prairie to Denver. They spent their first winter in Beaver Brook, in the foothills to the west of Denver. The following spring they were the first wagon to cross the Continental Divide on the new road over Rollins Pass. At Hot Sulphur Springs in Middle Park, James won a race to build the first permanent house, where they lived for over a year. During the spring of 1874, James took an exploratory trip west to the Yampa River with Missouri friends and staked his homestead claim at the site that became Steamboat Springs. In the spring of 1876 the Crawford family returned to live permanently in Steamboat Springs. Over the next five years, they were the only permanent family in the area. Their most frequent visitors were the Ute Indian families that came to the area during the summer months to enjoy the many springs. The Crawfords traded with the Indians, shared food and medical supplies, and became friends and playmates with the Ute children. Over the following years the Crawford cabin became the center of a growing pioneer community. It was the first post office, the first school, the first church, and the first library. During the scare of the Meeker Massacre, the cabin became a haven for the area. Governor John Routt appointed James as the first county judge of Routt County (1877), the first Postmaster (1878), and the first Superintendent of Schools (1879). He was twice elected to represent the county in the Colorado legislature (1879 and 1887), and once elected as county judge (1883). When Routt County became a separate county, he was the foreman for the first grand jury to convene (1885). In 1883 the first school was built near their cabin, with their daughter Lulie as the first teacher. In 1884, Margaret helped organize and build Union Church, a non-denominational church that was the first church building in northwest Colorado.

== Later years ==
In 1884, James organized the Steamboat Springs Town Company with the financial backing of investors from Boulder. With James as manager, the company laid out the town, sold lots, built a bathhouse, and promoted the town in diverse ways such as running the quarry and financing the first printing presses for the Steamboat Pilot newspaper. With the addition of the Suttle sawmill in 1883, the town grew rapidly over the late 1880s and 1890s. The Crawfords built a small frame house in 1886 and a large stone house in 1894, both within sight of their log cabin. In 1900, the Steamboat Springs Company incorporated the town, with James as the first mayor of Steamboat Springs. He continued to be instrumental in developing the land for the new town: half of the original town site lies on his homestead.

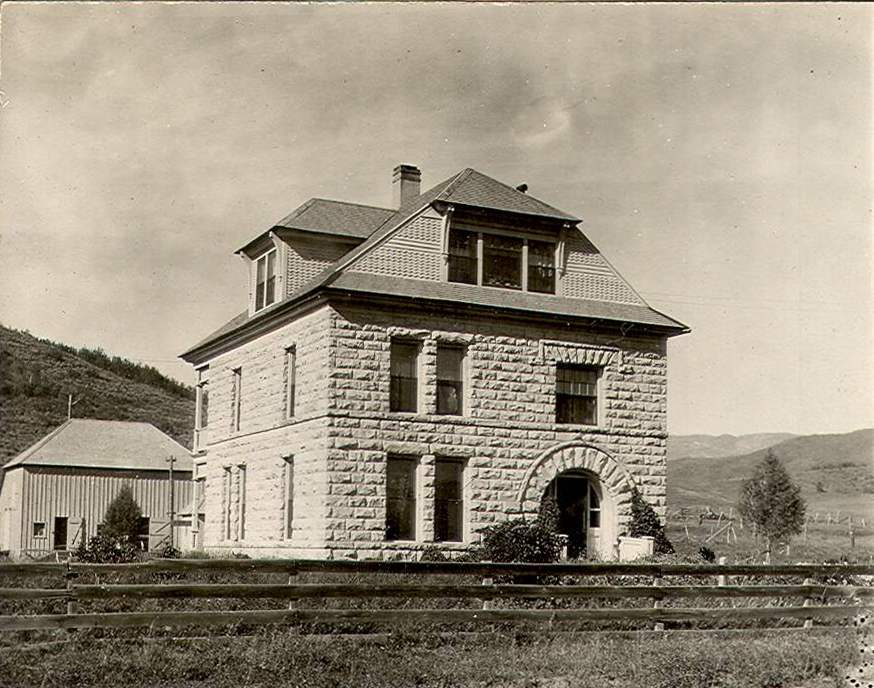
The Crawford House, James and Margaret's home in Steamboat Springs

James discovered the largest onyx mine in Colorado within sight of his home, on the side of Howelson Hill. He found financial backing and became the manager of the Colorado Onyx Company. The mine supplied the onyx used to form the columns and walls at the entrance to the Colorado Mineral Exhibit at the Louisiana Purchase Exposition in St. Louis in 1904. James also discovered a large coal deposit northwest of Steamboat Springs which became known as the Crawford field and was sold to the Elkhead Anthracite Coal Company.

== Legacy ==
Throughout their lives, the Crawfords welcomed one and all to visit and spend the night, and their house was always the social hub of the community. Charles Leckenby, long-time editor of the Steamboat Pilot, said about James, "By unanimous consent he is conceded to have been the foremost and most influential private citizen of Northwestern Colorado for many years." Margaret was one of 18 women honored during the Colorado State Centennial by being depicted in a tapestry that now hangs in the Colorado State Capitol. The Crawford House survives and is on the National Register of Historic Places.
