= Christian Science Society (Nanaimo) =

Church in British Columbia, Canada

Coordinates: 49°10′9.09″N 123°56′18.18″W

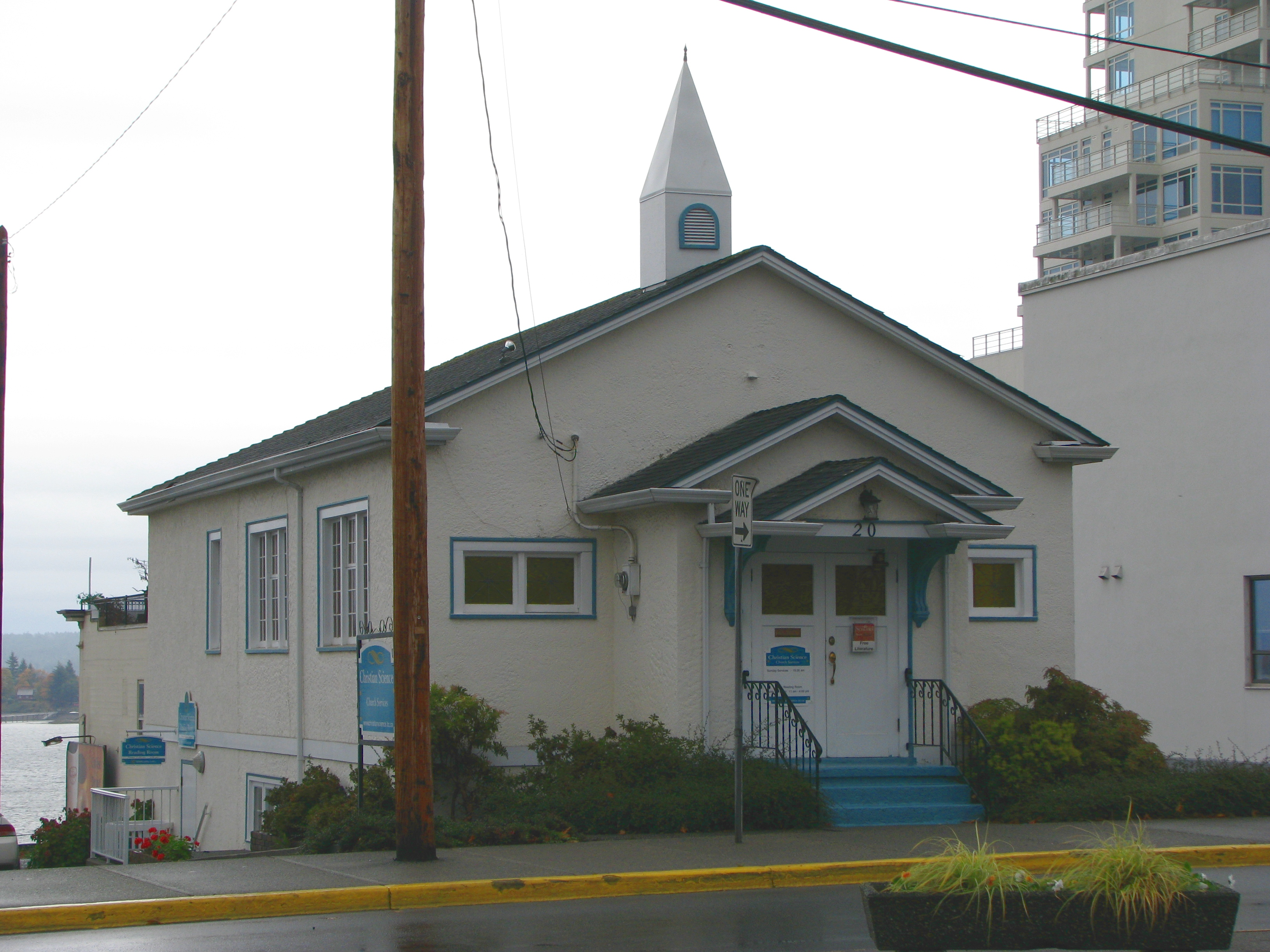
- 20 Chapel Street, Nanaimo

General information
- Architectural style: Classical Revival.
- Location: Nanaimo, British Columbia, Canada
- Construction started: 1900–1910; 116 years ago built as house
- Completed: 1932; 94 years ago renovated to church

Technical details
- Structural system: 1-storey. frame, 1932 set on concrete foundation & stuccoed

Design and construction
- Architect: D.G. Edgell/Phil Forte

Christian Science Society, also called the Christian Science Society Building, is an historic single storey style Christian Science church edifice located at 20 Chapel Street in Nanaimo, British Columbia, Canada. It was built between 1900 and 1910 as a single-family house and was known as the McDonald Property. In 1932 it was converted to church use by being placed on a concrete foundation and having its exterior stuccoed while the interior was gutted and remodeled for its new use. Citing the building as a "good example of early adaptive re-use" and '"very good example of Classical Period Revival architecture", albeit "a very modest rendition of the style", the city designated it a local heritage site on October 7, 2002.

Christian Science Society is still an active congregation listed in the Christian Science Journal.

== See also ==
- List of national historic sites of Canada
