= Steamboat Springs, Colorado =

City in Colorado, United States

- Home rule municipality
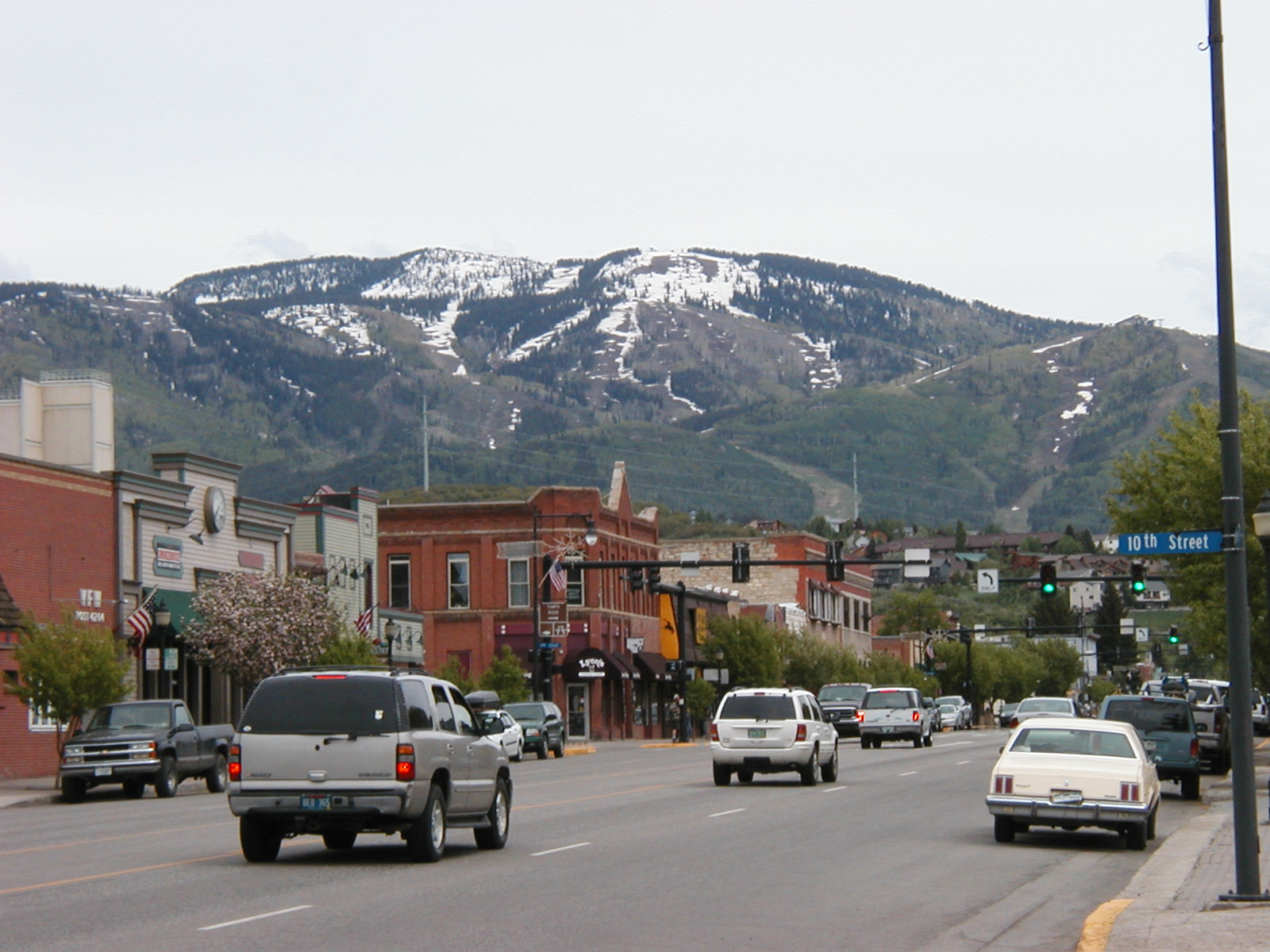
- Downtown Steamboat Springs in May 2006 with the ski area in the background
- Nickname: Ski Town USA
- Location of the City of Steamboat Springs in Routt County, Colorado
- Coordinates: 40°28′22″N 106°48′59″W
- Country: United States
- State: Colorado
- County: Routt County
- City: Steamboat Springs
- Incorporated: July 19, 1900

Government
  - Type: Home rule municipality

Area
  - Total: 9.90 sq mi (25.64 km^{2})
  - Land: 9.89 sq mi (25.61 km^{2})
  - Water: 0.012 sq mi (0.03 km^{2})
- Elevation: 6,867 ft (2,093 m)

Population (2020)
  - Total: 13,224
  - Density: 1,337/sq mi (516.4/km^{2})
- Time zone: UTC−7 (MST)
  - Summer (DST): UTC−6 (MDT)
- ZIP Codes: 80477, 80487, 80488
- Area code: 970
- FIPS code: 08-73825
- GNIS feature ID: 2411976
- Website: City Website

Steamboat Springs is a home rule municipality that is the county seat of and the most populous municipality in Routt County, Colorado, United States. The population was 13,224 at the 2020 census. Steamboat Springs is the principal city of the Steamboat Springs Micropolitan Statistical Area, and it is the largest city in northwestern Colorado.

The city is a winter ski resort destination, including the Steamboat Ski Resort on Mount Werner in the Park Range just east of the town and the much smaller Howelsen Hill Ski Area. Steamboat Springs has produced more athletes for the Winter Olympics than any other town in North America.

Steamboat Springs – known colloquially as "The Boat" – is located in the upper valley of the Yampa River, along U.S. Highway 40, just west of the Continental Divide and Rabbit Ears Pass. It is located approximately 150 miles northwest of Denver, and sits approximately 45 miles south of the Wyoming border. It is served by Steamboat Springs Airport (general aviation) and commercial service at nearby Yampa Valley Airport.

== History ==
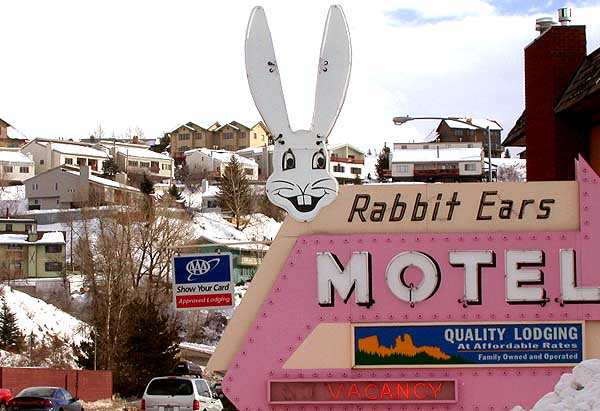
Steamboat Springs is a mix of older architecture and newer resort developments, especially near the ski resort on the eastern edge of town.

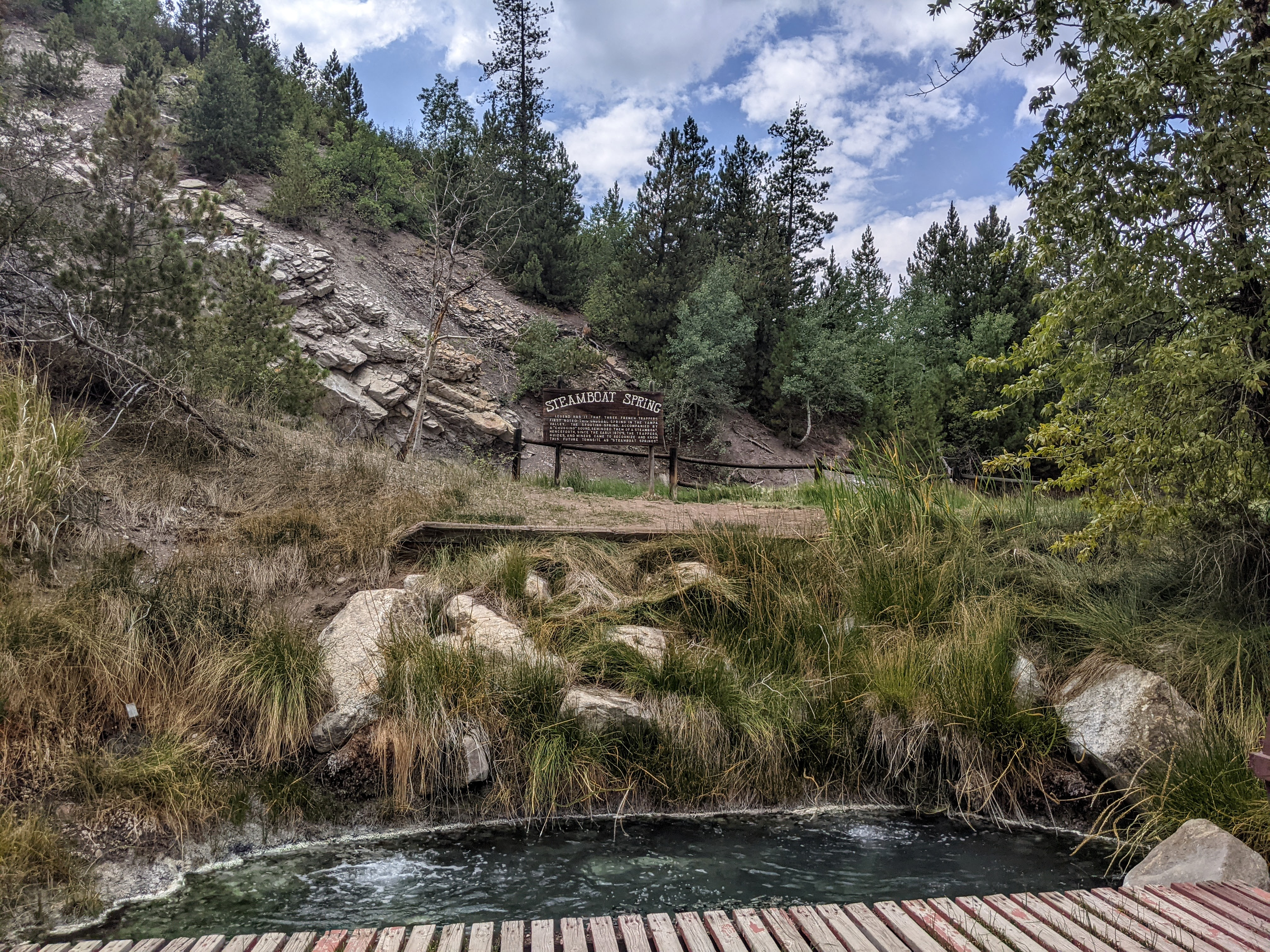
The Steamboat Spring, with history marker sign

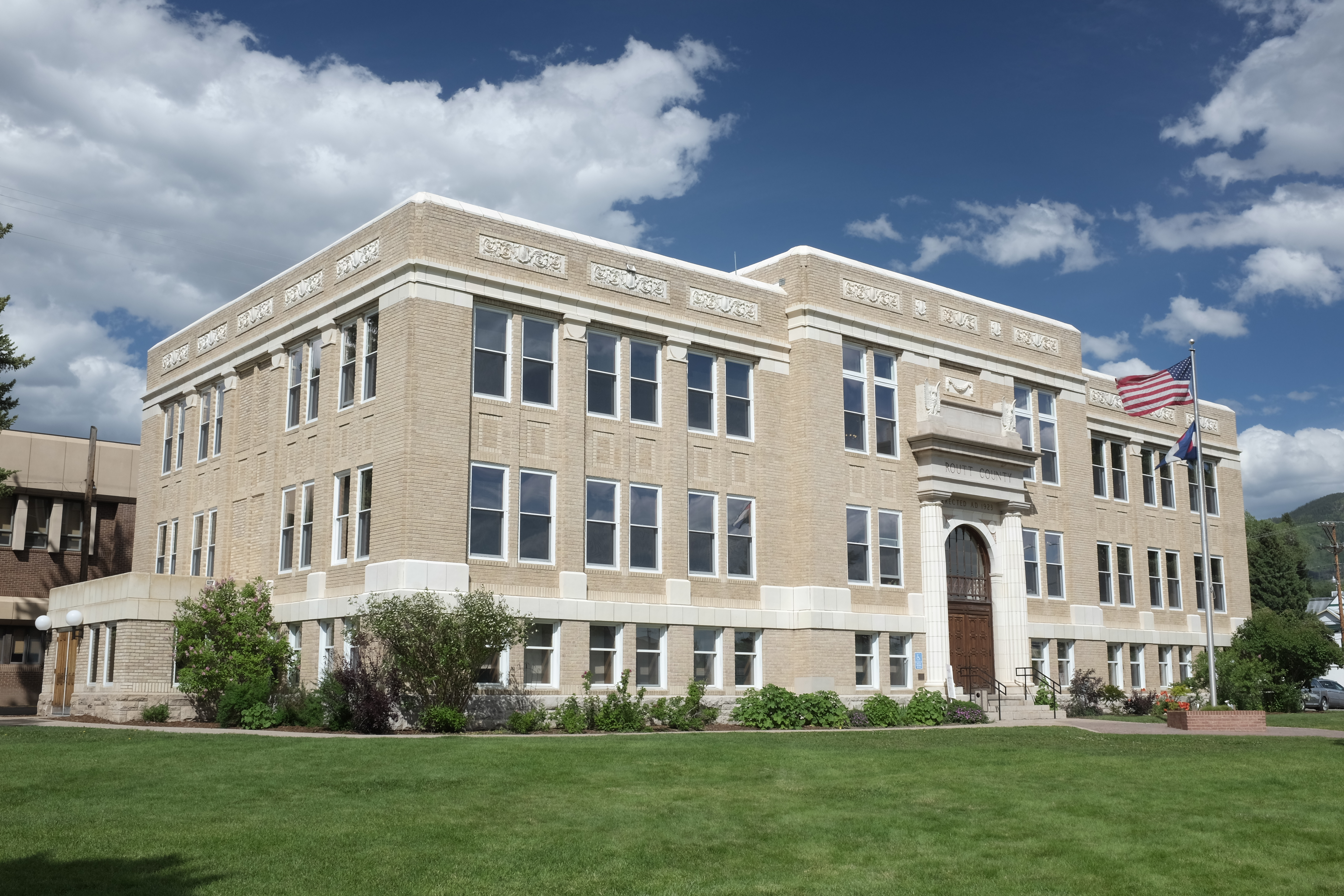
The Routt County Courthouse in Steamboat Springs

The area surrounding Steamboat Springs was originally inhabited by the Yampatika band of the Utes, who hunted in the valley during the summer. Trappers began to move through the area during the first decades of the 19th century. James Harvey Crawford, the founder of Steamboat Springs, first arrived in the spring of 1874. The Crawford family moved there in 1876, and for the first five years were the sole permanent white residents of the town. The native Utes were forcibly removed from the area to a reservation in Utah by the U.S. Army starting in 1879. Milestones in the development of the pioneer town included the first sawmill in 1873, incorporation of the town in 1900, and the arrival of the railroad in 1909. The economy of the region was originally based on ranching and mining, which still have a large presence in the county.

Steamboat is home to several natural hot springs that are located throughout the area (see Geography). Upon first hearing a chugging sound, early trappers believed that a steamboat was coming down the river. When the trappers saw that there was no steamboat, and that the sound was coming from a hot spring, they decided to name the spring Steamboat Spring.

Originally, skiing was the only method of transportation during harsh and snowy Rocky Mountain winters. In turn, the popularity of skiing as a winter pastime catalyzed development of the town and other communities all over the Rocky Mountains. In 1913, Carl Howelsen, a Norwegian, moved to town and introduced ski jumping. Howelsen built the first jump on Howelsen Hill, now part of the Howelsen Ski Area. He also founded the annual Winter Carnival, a celebration still held each winter. The festival includes ski racing and jumping, dog sledding, and chariot events down Lincoln Avenue, the city's main street. Light shows on both Mount Werner and Howelsen Hill are highlights. Howelsen also founded the Steamboat Springs Winter Sports Club and built the town's first ski jumps. The oldest continually operating ski area in North America, Howelsen Hill, now bears his name and is one of just three complete ski jumping complexes in the United States.

The Steamboat Ski Resort was largely established by two local men, Jim Temple and John Fetcher. Temple led the effort to develop the area. Fetcher, a local rancher, was the main designer and builder. The resort opened on what was then called Storm Mountain in 1963.

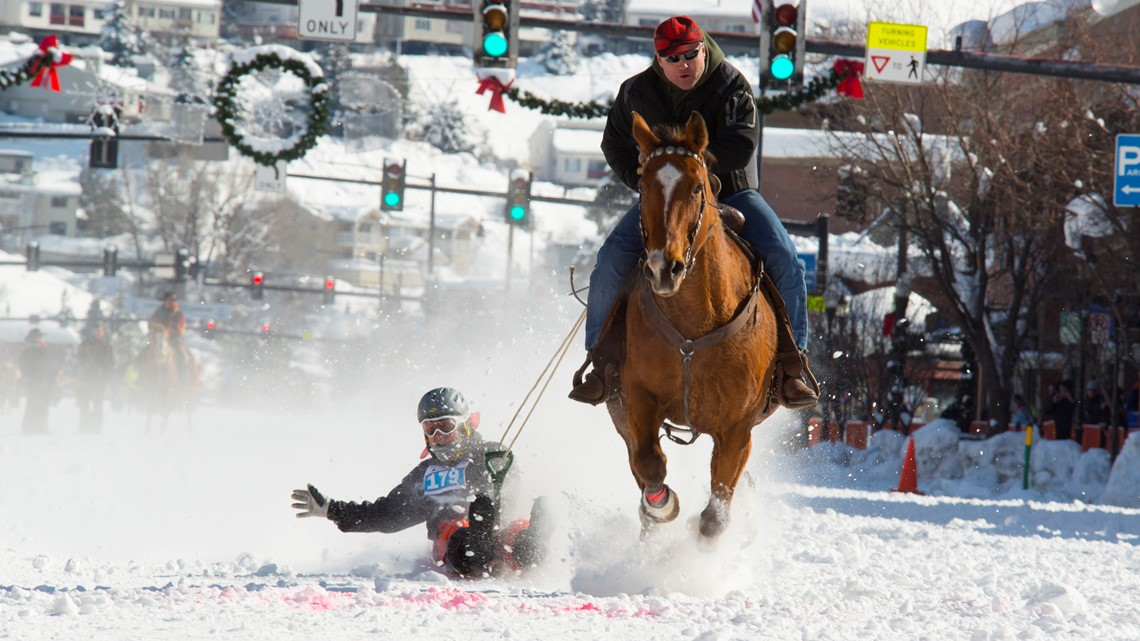
A kid sledding behind a horse down Main Street during Winter Carnival in Steamboat Springs

In 1974, The Industrial Company (TIC) was started in Steamboat Springs and has since grown into one of the largest industrial construction companies in the United States with revenues of approximately $2 billion in 2007. The company is one of the largest employers in Routt County and has more than 9,000 employees worldwide. TIC - The Industrial Company was acquired by Kiewit Engineering and all operations except the Training Center moved elsewhere (Denver, etc.). The main TIC complex on Routt County Road 129 has been acquired by Yampa Valley Electric Association as their new headquarters, with extensive renovation. This property provides ample areas for offices, vehicle maintenance, and construction laydown activities.

In 1993, the City Council of Steamboat Springs, Colorado, conducted a poll of its residents to choose a new name for the bridge that crossed the Yampa River on Shield Drive. With 7,717 votes, the winning name was "James Brown Soul Center of the Universe Bridge". The bridge was officially dedicated in September 1993, and James Brown appeared at the ribbon-cutting ceremony for the event.

=== Historic buildings ===
Historic buildings in Steamboat Springs include:

- Christian Science Society, at 7th and Oak, was built of logs in 1934 and is now listed on the National Register of Historic Places.
- The Crawford House, at 12th and Crawford, was built of local stone in 1894 by the founder of Steamboat, James Harvey Crawford, and is now listed on the National Register of Historic Places.

== Geography ==
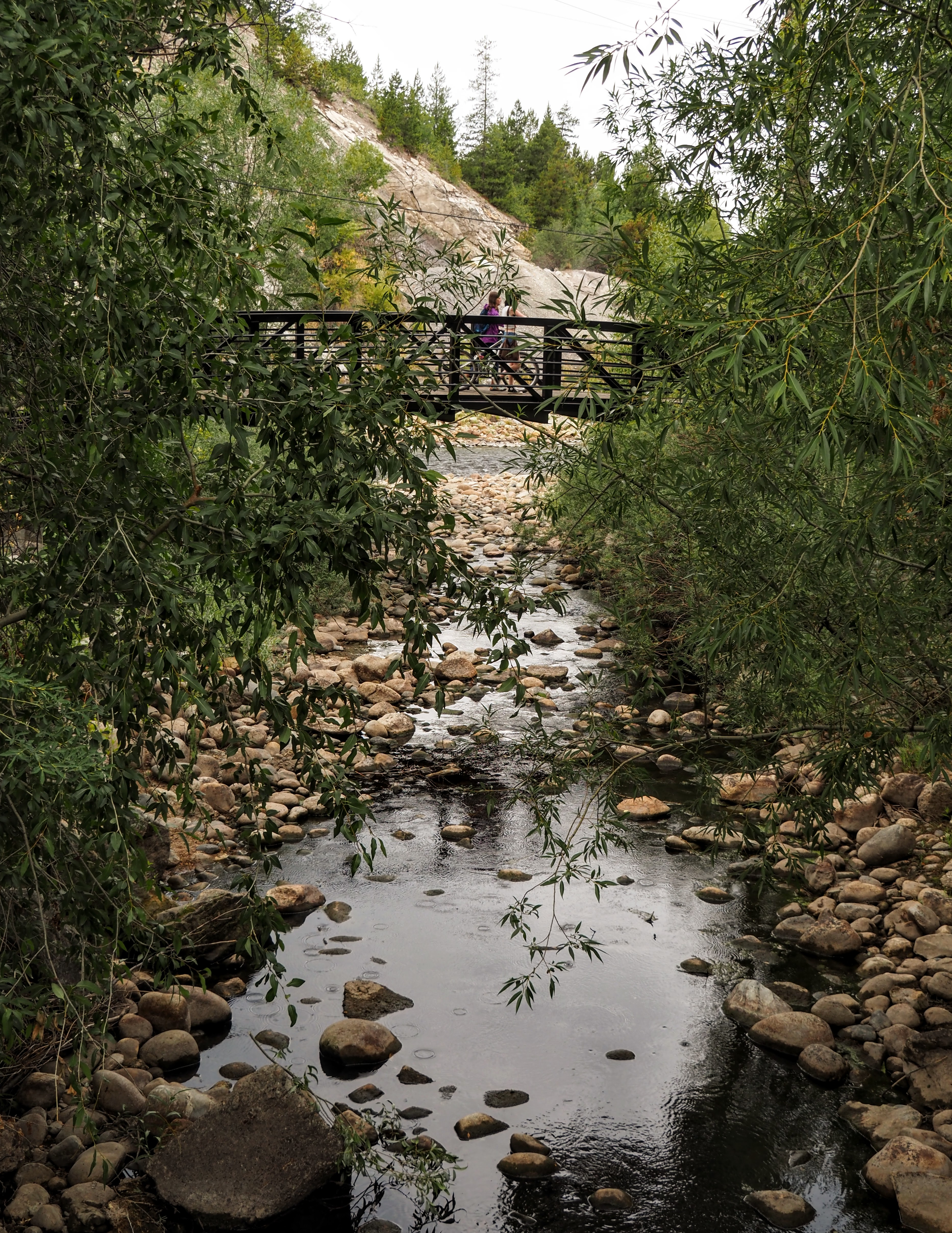
Soda Creek, looking toward the Yampa River confluence, by the Bud Werner Memorial Library in Steamboat Springs

According to the United States Census Bureau, the city has a total area of 9.9 square miles (26 km^{2}), all of it land except for the Yampa River.

The Yampa Valley and surrounding area contain several geothermal hot springs. The city is named after the Steamboat Spring, located near the present-day library and the old train depot. The spring itself was so named because its bubbling sounded like a steamboat to early settlers.

Though there are no steamboats in the town, except for an allegorical "steamboat" playground in West Lincoln Park which was designed to resemble a steamboat and has since been mostly torn down. The area offers hot springs that are open to the public.

The Yampa River flows through the middle of town.

=== Climate ===
According to the Köppen Climate Classification system, Steamboat Springs has a warm-summer humid continental climate, abbreviated "Dfb" on climate maps. The hottest temperature recorded in Steamboat Springs was 100 °F (37.8 °C) on June 29, 1990, while the coldest temperature recorded was −54 °F (−47.8 °C) on January 7, 1913.

Climate data for Steamboat Springs, Colorado (1991–2020 normals, extremes 1893–present)
Month	Jan	Feb	Mar	Apr	May	Jun	Jul	Aug	Sep	Oct	Nov	Dec	Year
Record high °F (°C)	57 (14)	59 (15)	70 (21)	79 (26)	95 (35)	100 (38)	99 (37)	98 (37)	93 (34)	89 (32)	72 (22)	64 (18)	100 (38)
Mean maximum °F (°C)	42.5 (5.8)	48.4 (9.1)	60.1 (15.6)	71.7 (22.1)	79.6 (26.4)	86.4 (30.2)	90.5 (32.5)	89.4 (31.9)	85.1 (29.5)	76.0 (24.4)	62.3 (16.8)	45.6 (7.6)	91.4 (33.0)
Mean daily maximum °F (°C)	29.2 (−1.6)	34.3 (1.3)	44.8 (7.1)	54.4 (12.4)	65.1 (18.4)	75.9 (24.4)	83.1 (28.4)	81.5 (27.5)	73.5 (23.1)	59.3 (15.2)	42.9 (6.1)	30.4 (−0.9)	56.2 (13.4)
Daily mean °F (°C)	16.9 (−8.4)	21.1 (−6.1)	31.2 (−0.4)	40.5 (4.7)	49.6 (9.8)	57.6 (14.2)	64.5 (18.1)	62.8 (17.1)	54.6 (12.6)	42.7 (5.9)	29.7 (−1.3)	18.3 (−7.6)	40.8 (4.9)
Mean daily minimum °F (°C)	4.6 (−15.2)	7.9 (−13.4)	17.6 (−8.0)	26.7 (−2.9)	34.0 (1.1)	39.2 (4.0)	45.8 (7.7)	44.2 (6.8)	35.7 (2.1)	26.1 (−3.3)	16.4 (−8.7)	6.3 (−14.3)	25.4 (−3.7)
Mean minimum °F (°C)	−17.1 (−27.3)	−13.5 (−25.3)	−1.3 (−18.5)	12.2 (−11.0)	22.2 (−5.4)	29.9 (−1.2)	36.5 (2.5)	35.3 (1.8)	24.5 (−4.2)	11.4 (−11.4)	−3.7 (−19.8)	−14.9 (−26.1)	−22.1 (−30.1)
Record low °F (°C)	−54 (−48)	−48 (−44)	−34 (−37)	−15 (−26)	8 (−13)	16 (−9)	21 (−6)	20 (−7)	6 (−14)	−16 (−27)	−28 (−33)	−44 (−42)	−54 (−48)
Average precipitation inches (mm)	2.46 (62)	1.92 (49)	1.58 (40)	2.54 (65)	2.65 (67)	1.58 (40)	1.72 (44)	1.80 (46)	2.32 (59)	2.22 (56)	1.93 (49)	1.96 (50)	24.68 (627)
Average snowfall inches (cm)	46.6 (118)	35.7 (91)	19.5 (50)	13.2 (34)	2.8 (7.1)	0.3 (0.76)	0.0 (0.0)	0.0 (0.0)	0.4 (1.0)	6.9 (18)	23.3 (59)	35.8 (91)	184.5 (469.86)
Average extreme snow depth inches (cm)	30.5 (77)	35.0 (89)	27.9 (71)	7.5 (19)	1.4 (3.6)	0.2 (0.51)	0.0 (0.0)	0.0 (0.0)	0.3 (0.76)	3.9 (9.9)	9.9 (25)	21.0 (53)	37.7 (96)
Average precipitation days (≥ 0.01 in)	14.8	13.4	10.6	12.5	12.7	8.3	9.4	11.7	9.5	9.3	10.4	13.4	136.0
Average snowy days (≥ 0.1 in)	14.9	14.3	8.7	6.6	1.5	0.3	0.0	0.0	0.5	3.1	8.8	14.0	72.7
Source: NOAA

== Demographics ==
Historical population
Census	Pop.	Note	%±
1910	1,227		—
1920	1,249		1.8%
1930	1,198		−4.1%
1940	1,613		34.6%
1950	1,913		18.6%
1960	1,843		−3.7%
1970	2,340		27.0%
1980	5,098		117.9%
1990	6,695		31.3%
2000	9,815		46.6%
2010	12,088		23.2%
2020	13,224		9.4%
U.S. Decennial Census

As of the census of 2010, there were 12,088 people, 5,201 households, and 2,275 families residing in the city. There were 9,966 housing units. The racial makeup of the city was 94% White, 0.6% Asian, 0.8% African American, 0.4% Native American, 0.1% Pacific Islander, 0.7% from other races, and 2.5% from two or more races. Hispanic or Latino of any race were 8.5% of the population.

There were 4,201 households, out of which 24.3% had children under the age of 18 living with them, 43.2% were married couples living together, 6.2% had a female householder with no husband present, and 46.6% were non-families. Additionally, 28.5% of all households were made up of individuals, and 2.5% had someone living alone who was 65 years of age or older. The average household size was 2.27 and the average family size was 2.81.

The median age of Steamboat's population was 36.5 years. By sex, the population was 54.2 percent male, 45.8 percent female.

The median income for a household in the city was $54,647, and the median income for a family was $65,685. Males had a median income of $35,536 versus $28,244 for females. The per capita income for the city was $31,695. About 2.7% of families and 7.2% of the population were below the poverty line, including 4.4% of those under age 18 and 3.1% of those age 65 or over.

== Housing ==
Steamboat Springs has a severe housing shortage. The median housing price for a single family home was $829,000 in 2022, which is up from $529,000 in 2019. Rent for a one-bedroom apartment is around $2,100.

Attempts to increase housing supply in Steamboat Springs have been blocked by residents. In 2010, the city council approved a plan to build thousands of condominiums in Steamboat Springs, but residents put the plan up for a ballot initiative where it was soundly defeated. In 2024, a plan to build nearly 2,300 affordable housing units intended for priced-out workers in Steamboat Springs was blocked by residents in a ballot initiative.

== Education ==
Steamboat Springs is served by Steamboat Springs School District RE-2. The district is home to seven schools:

- Soda Creek Elementary School
- Strawberry Park Elementary School
- Steamboat Springs Middle School
- Steamboat Springs High School
- North Routt Community Charter School
- Sleeping Giant School
- Yampa Valley Alternative High School

The city is also home to the Steamboat Springs campus of Colorado Mountain College. CMC Steamboat Springs is notable for being the only college in the United States offering a degree in Ski & Snowboard Business, which focuses on the retail, manufacturing, and marketing of snowsports. In 2022, CMC Steamboat Springs enrolled 2,050 students.

== Sports ==
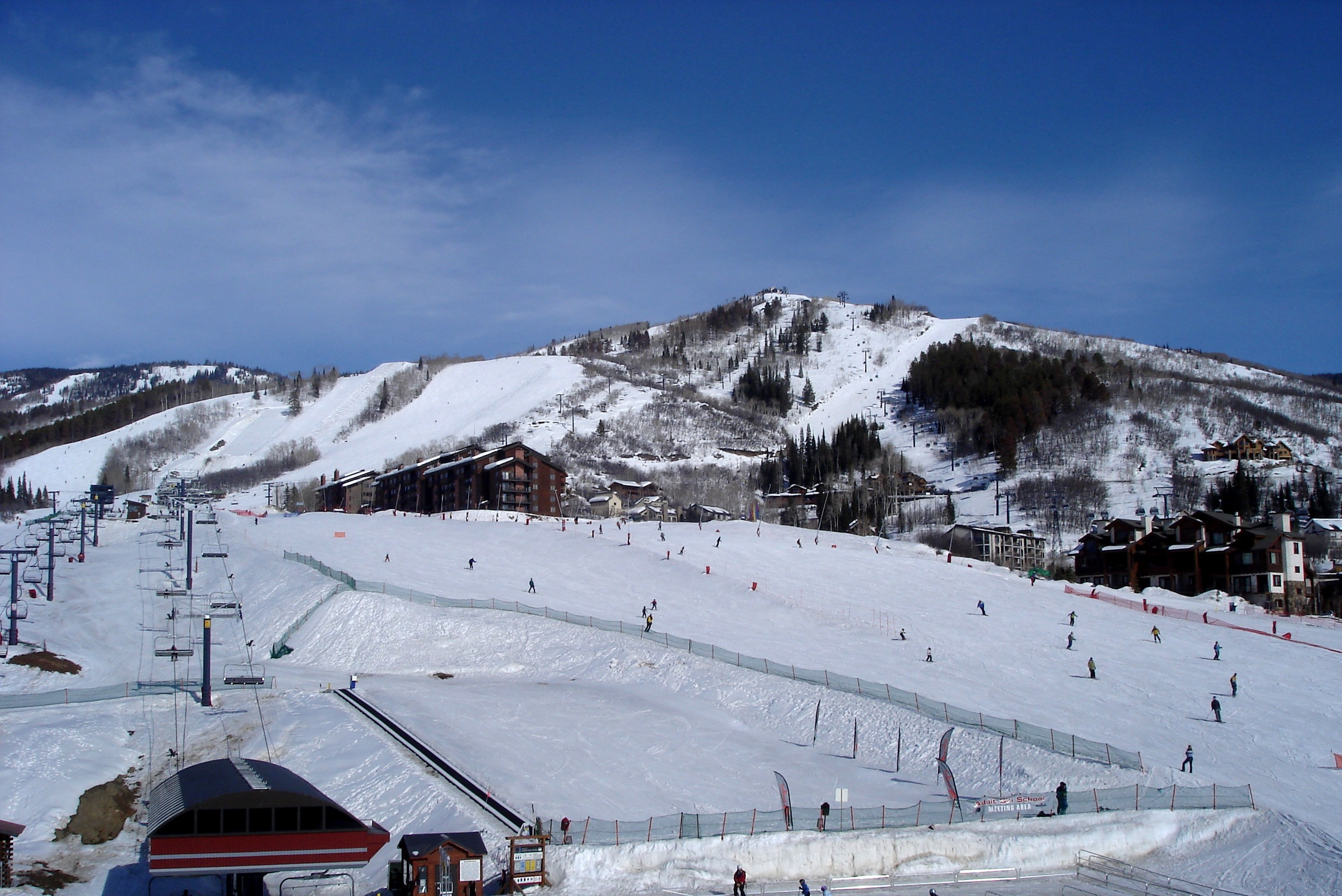
The ski resort at Steamboat Springs

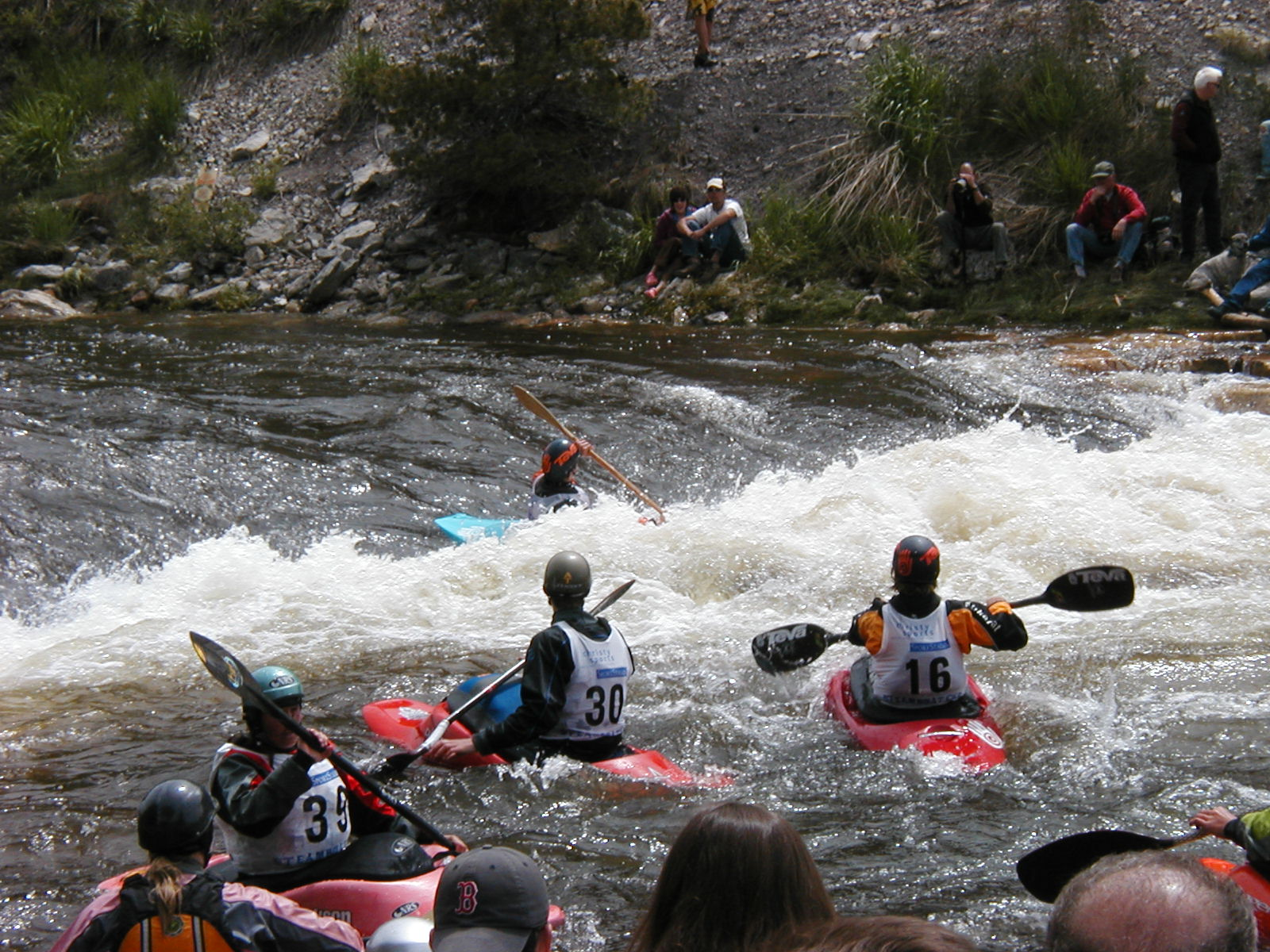
Kayakers at Charlie's Hole on the Yampa River

Steamboat Springs offers skiing opportunities and has been the locale for skiing competitions including the 1989 and 1990 Alpine Skiing World Cup.

The Yampa river is a location for water sports like fishing, rafting, tubing, and kayaking (playboating). The 4-mile (6.4 km) grade II-III whitewater run through town ends with two surfable holes. One is called D-Hole; the other one—near the library, close to the Steamboat Spring—is named Charlie's Hole or C-Hole for short, after local kayaker Charlie Beavers (1981–2002). Beavers started kayaking at age 12, was the first to explore a number of rivers ("first descents"), and successfully contended in playboating competitions. He died in a non-boating accident in 2002. The hole and some kayaking events were dedicated to him.

Every year on the first weekend of June, Steamboat Springs organizes the Yampa River Festival. It includes a kayak rodeo (i.e., a playboating competition) which attracts national and international world class playboaters. Additional events include, but are not limited to, a downriver race which is Colorado's only upstream slalom race, and the Crazy River Dog Contest, in which dogs retrieve sticks from the river and may pass a whitewater section.

The defunct ski area Stagecoach is about twenty miles (32 km) south of Steamboat. It lasted two ski seasons, closing in 1974.

== Notable people ==
- Debbie Armstrong (born 1963), alpine skier and Olympic gold medalist; lives in Steamboat Springs
- Chris Baumann (born 1987), rugby union player, prop for Leicester Tigers and USA Eagles
- Nelson Carmichael (born 1965), mogul skier and Olympic bronze medalist; born in Steamboat Springs
- Jason Colby (born 2006), ski jumper; born in Steamboat Springs
- James Harvey Crawford (1845–1930), founder of Steamboat Springs
- Shannon Dunn-Downing (born 1972), freestyle snowboarder; raised in Steamboat Springs
- Taylor Fletcher (born 1990), Nordic combined skier
- Arielle Gold (born 1996), Olympic bronze medalist and World Champion snowboarder
- Taylor Gold (born 1993), Olympian snowboarder; born in Steamboat Springs
- Carroll Hardy (born 1933), former Major League Baseball player; resided in Steamboat Springs
- Tyler Johnson (born 1986), Grammy award-winning songwriter and producer.
- Billy Kidd (born 1943), alpine skier and Olympic silver medalist
- Caroline Lalive (born 1979), alpine skier and two-time Olympian
- Todd Lodwick (born 1976), Nordic combined skier; born in Steamboat Springs
- Verne Lundquist (born 1940), television sportscaster; resides in Steamboat Springs
- Travis Mayer (born 1982), freestyle skier and Olympic silver medalist
- Carey McWilliams (1905–1980), author, editor, lawyer
- Robin Olds (1922–2007), ace fighter pilot and WWII/Vietnam fighter group commander
- Trey Parker (born 1969), actor, animator, writer, producer, director, and composer.
- Ryan Max Riley (born 1979), freestyle skier and humorist
- Reese Roper (born 1973), singer and songwriter; born in Steamboat Springs
- Ryan Serhant (born 1984), celebrity real estate broker and television personality
- Andrew Sisco (born 1983), baseball player; born in Steamboat Springs
- Johnny Spillane (born 1980), Nordic combined skier; born in Steamboat Springs
- Steven Ray Swanson (born 1960), engineer and a NASA astronaut
- Alvin P. Wegeman (1927–2015), Nordic combined skier
- Buddy Werner (1936–1964), Olympic alpine skier born and raised in Steamboat Springs
- Gordon Wren (1919–1999), ski jumper; last lived and died in Steamboat Springs

== Transportation ==
- Bustang
- Colorado State Highway 131
- Steamboat Springs Airport
- U.S. Route 40 in Colorado
- Yampa Valley Airport

== Sister cities ==
Steamboat Springs has two sister cities, as designated by Sister Cities International:

- Saas-Fee, Valais, Switzerland
- San Martín de los Andes, Neuquén, Argentina

== See also ==
- Fish Creek Falls
- Yampa River Botanic Park
