= Andrews Arboretum =

Arboretum in Boulder, Colorado

Coordinates: 40.0124°N 105.2772°W

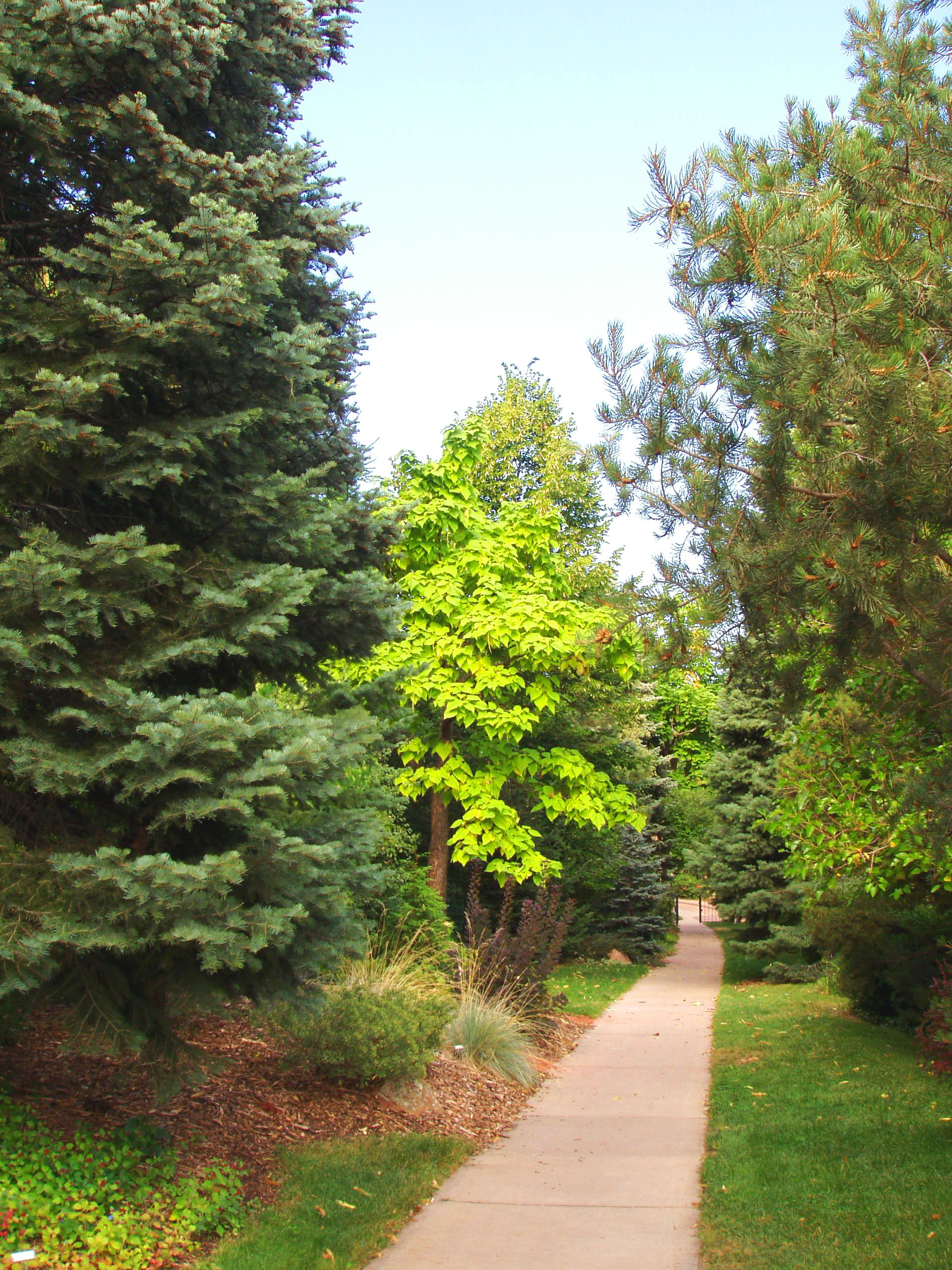
Andrews Arboretum, Boulder, Colorado.

Andrews Arboretum is a small arboretum located on the east side of Broadway between Grandview and Marine Streets in Boulder, Colorado, United States. It is open every day free of charge.

The arboretum was established in 1948 by Miss Maud Reed, a former botany teacher at Boulder High School. At her request, the arboretum was named after Darwin M. Andrews, a horticulturist from Boulder. In 1989 the arboretum was acquired by Boulder's Parks and Recreation Department, and is now managed by its Forestry Division. It contains native evergreens, cultivated shrubs, groundcovers, and exotic trees.

== See also ==
- List of botanical gardens in the United States
