= Chester M. Alter Arboretum =

Arboretum in the University of Denver

Coordinates: 39°40′35″N 104°57′45″W

The Chester M Alter Arboretum is an arboretum located on the campus of the University of Denver, 2467 South Vine Street, Denver, Colorado.

In 1999 the trees of the University Park campus were named an arboretum to honor Chancellor Emeritus Chester M Alter. The Arboretum comprises about 2,100 trees, including many rare specimens for Colorado. Specimens include: Giant Sequoia (Sequoiadendron giganteum), Dawn Redwood (Metasequoia glyptostroboides), Cedar of Lebanon (Cedrus libani), Bald Cypress (Taxodium distichum), Umbrella Pine (Sciadopitys) and many species of Maples (Acer) and Oaks (Quercus).

== See also ==
- List of botanical gardens in the United States
