= Charles H. Spencer House =

Historic house in Iowa, United States

- U.S. National Register of Historic Places
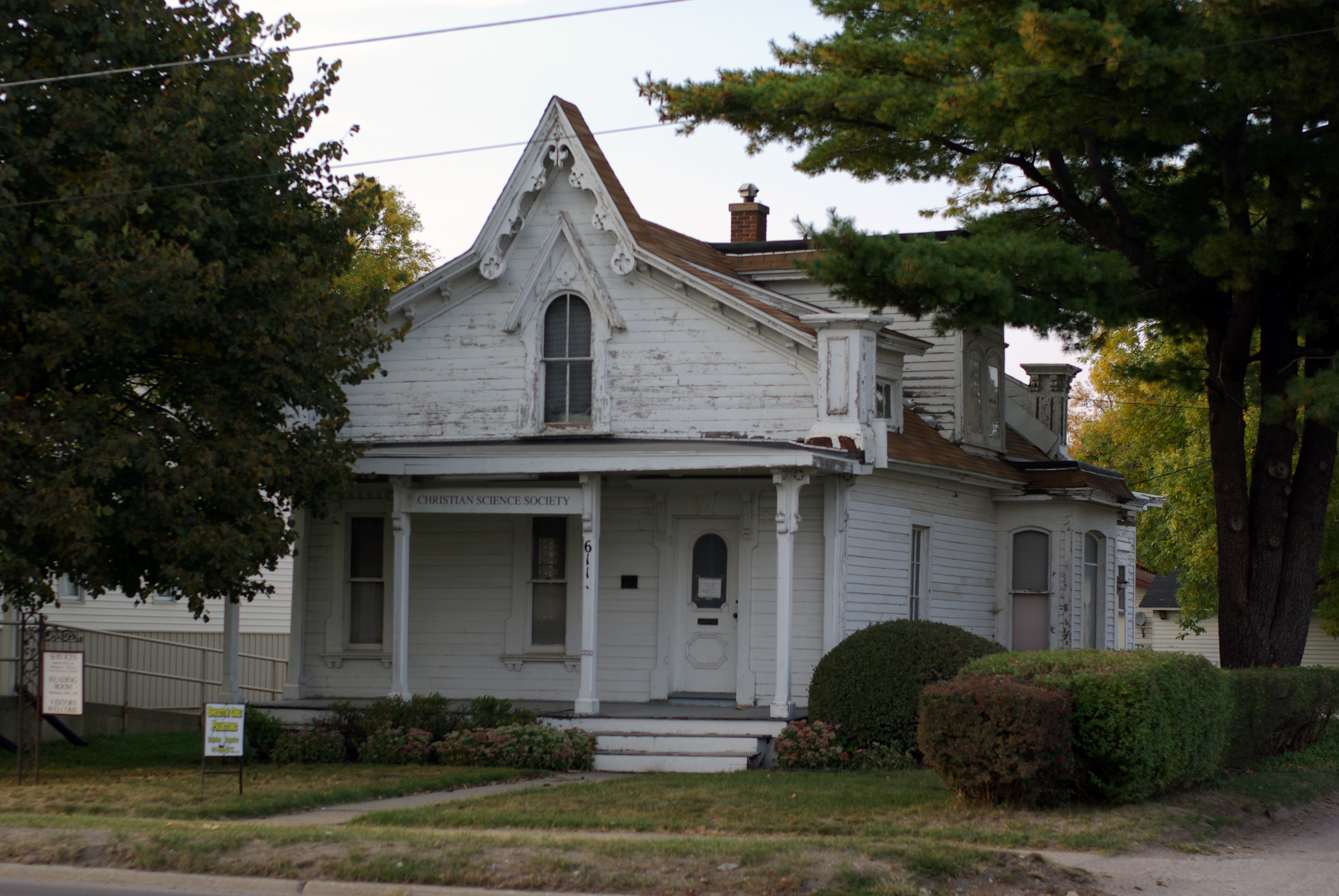

- Location within Iowa Location within the United States
- Location: 611 6th Avenue, Grinnell, Iowa
- Coordinates: 41°44′52.17″N 92°43′50.14″W
- Built: late 1860s
- Architectural style: Carpenter Gothic
- NRHP reference No.: 80001458
- Added to NRHP: January 25, 1980

Charles H. Spencer House, formerly Christian Science Society and First Church of Christ, Scientist, Grinnell, located in Grinnell, Iowa, in the United States, is an historic Carpenter Gothic house which was converted into a church. On January 25, 1980, it was added to the National Register of Historic Places.

== History ==
The Charles H. Spencer House was built at the corner of 6th Avenue and Main Street in the late 1860s as a private residence. Charles H. Spencer was the founder of the First National Bank of Grinnell. There was one intermediate move before the building was moved to its present location. It is no longer used as a church and now houses a gift shop.

== See also ==
- List of Registered Historic Places in Iowa
- First Church of Christ, Scientist (disambiguation)
