= Yampa River Botanic Park =

Botanical garden in Colorado, United States

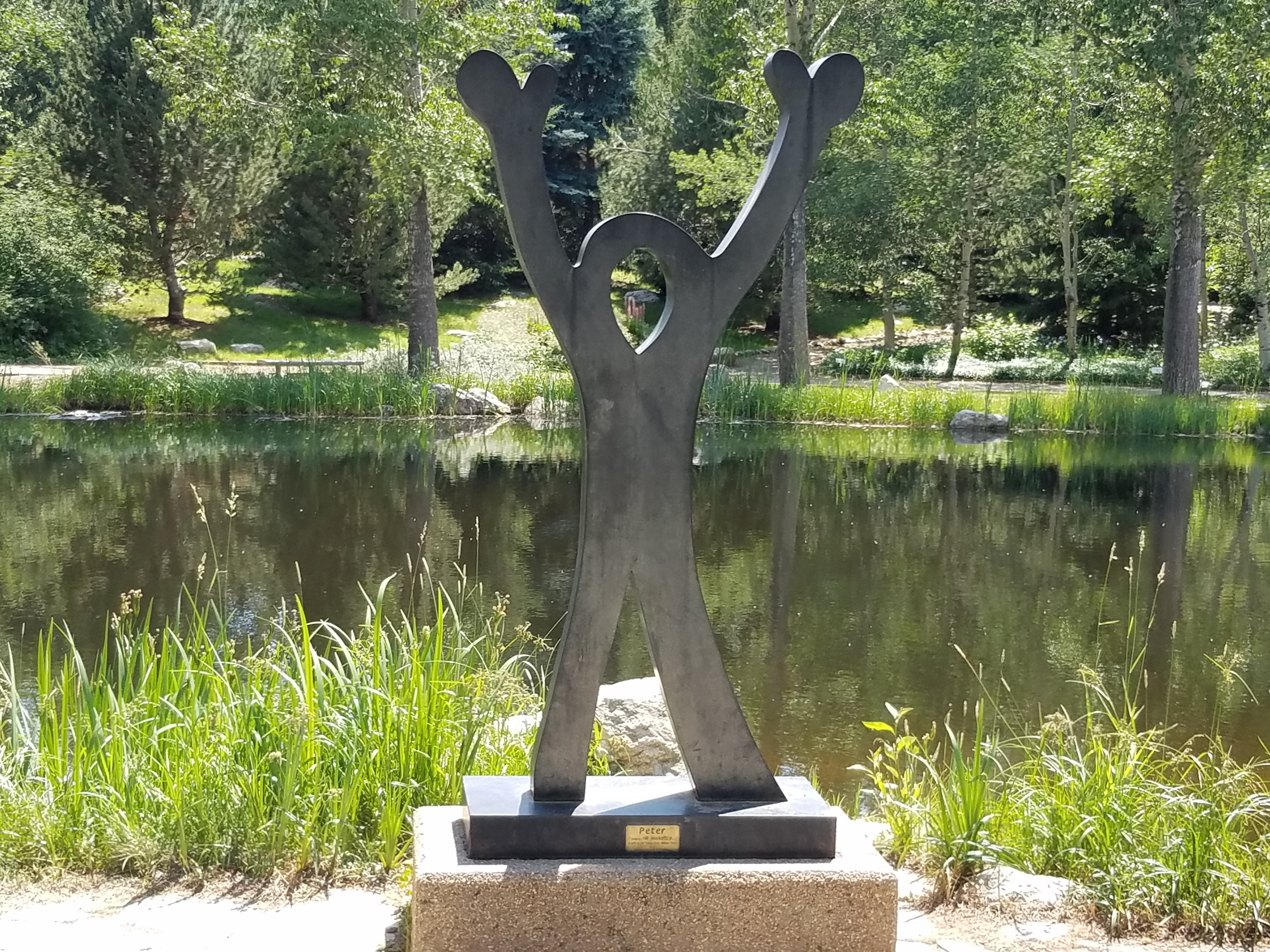
- Statue of Peter on the shore of Peter's Pond at Yampa River Botanic Park
- Interactive map of Yampa River Botanic Park
- Type: Botanical garden
- Location: Pamela Lane, off U.S. Highway 40, Steamboat Springs, Colorado
- Coordinates: 40.4697°N 106.8287°W
- Area: 6 acres (2.4 hectares)
- Elevation: 6,800 feet (2,100 m)
- Open: Dawn to dusk, spring through first heavy snow

The Yampa River Botanic Park is a botanical garden located on Pamela Lane, off U.S. Highway 40, outside Steamboat Springs, Colorado. It is open dawn to dusk from spring until the first heavy snow.

The 6-acre (2.4-hectare) park is situated in a valley beside the Yampa River at an altitude of 6,800 feet (2,100 m), with a frost-free growing season of approximately 60 days. Summers are dry and intensely sunny; winters are cold with heavy snow.

The park includes over 60 unique gardens: Annuals Garden, Butterfly Garden, Children's Garden, Corner Gardens, Culinary Herb Garden, Daylily Garden, Dorothy's Garden (native plants), Garden for All Seasons, Grove Garden (with aspens), Hidden Garden (shade), High Country Natives Garden, Hummingbird Garden, Iris Garden, Kerry's Garden (native and ornamental plants), Lynne's Garden (columbines), Medicinal Herb Garden, Members' Rock Garden, Penstemon Garden, Pioneer Garden, Pond Garden (water lilies, etc.), Rainbow Garden, Reflecting Garden (Japanese garden with reflecting pond), Rose Garden, September Charm Garden, Spring Bulb Garden, Summer Bulb Garden, Summer Sunshine Garden, Trail Garden, Tranquility Garden, Vegetable Garden, Water Wise Garden, and Windigo Garden.

== See also ==
- List of botanical gardens in the United States
- Guest Commentary: What the Yampa River Botanic Park means to me | SteamboatToday.com
