= Soul Daddy =

American fast casual restaurant

- Type: division of ANGR Holdings, LLC
- Industry: Restaurant
- Founded: May 2, 2011; 15 years ago
- Founder: Jamawn Woods
- Defunct: June 28, 2011; 15 years ago
- Fate: Purchased by Chipotle Mexican Grill
- Headquarters: Denver, Colorado, USA
- Number of locations: 3
- Area served: United States
- Key people: Jamawn Woods (founder); Steve Ells (investor); Curtis Stone (investor); Bobby Flay (investor); Lorena Garcia (investor)
- Parent: ANGR Holdings

Soul Daddy was an American fast casual restaurant founded by Jamawn Woods, with a focus on a soul food-centered menu. As a contestant on the reality television show America's Next Great Restaurant, which aired in 2011, he created the concept for Soul Daddy (originally conceived of as W3, or Woods' Wings & Waffles), and was named the winner in the show's first-season finale on May 1, 2011. The restaurant chain opened on May 2, 2011, at three locations: at the Mall of America in Bloomington, Minnesota, at Hollywood and Highland in Los Angeles, and at the South Street Seaport in Manhattan at 189 Front Street.

The Manhattan and Los Angeles locations closed on June 14 and 15, 2011 in order for Woods to focus on making the Mall of America location successful, only for that location to close two weeks later on June 28. The restaurant was managed by ANGR Holdings, LLC (ANGR), a limited liability company. Chipotle Mexican Grill purchased Steve Ells's investment in the company at his cost, provided support for company operations, and invested a total of $2.3 million in cash contributions, $220,000 of which was invested by Ells in particular.

== History ==
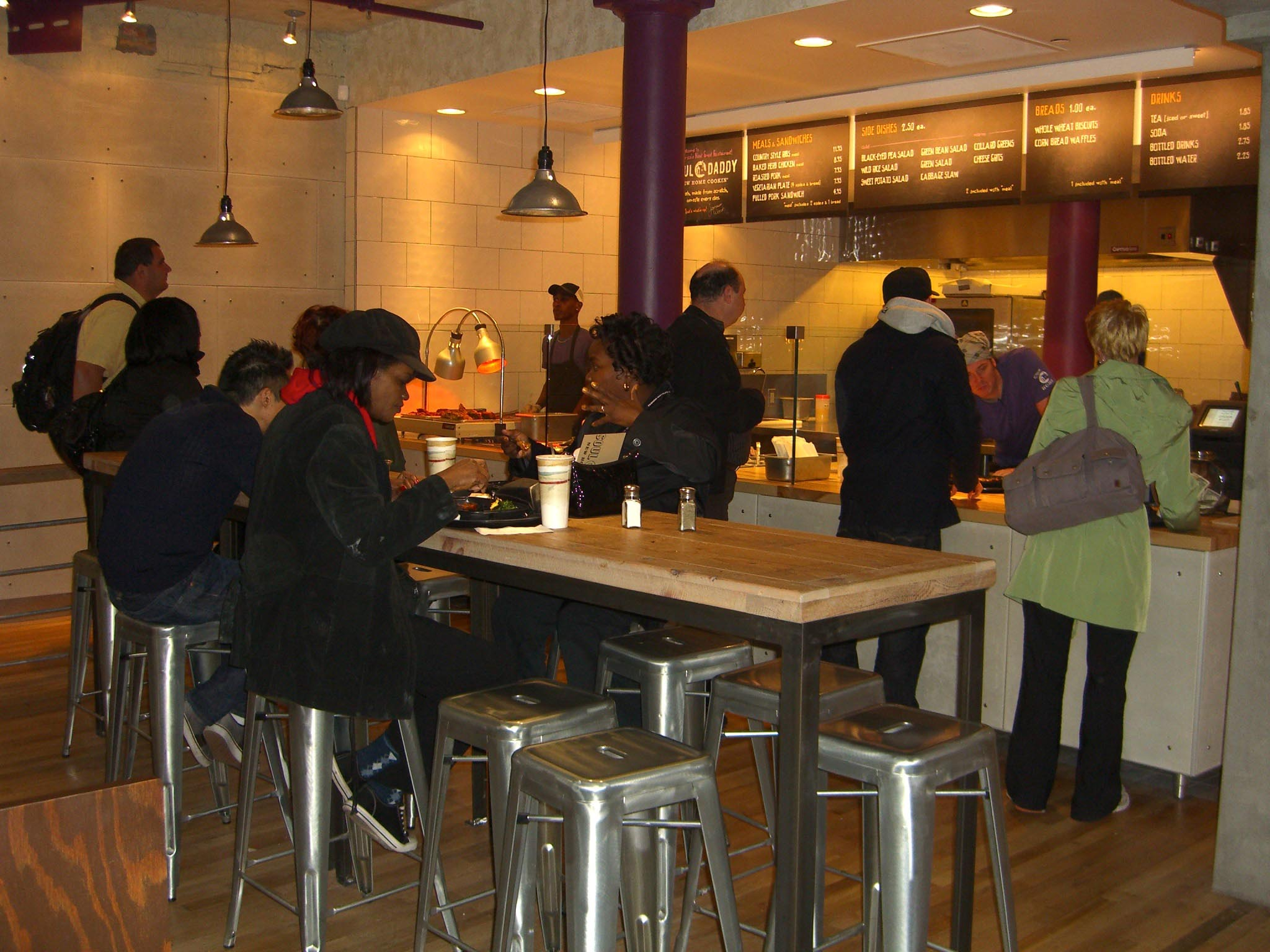
The New York City Soul Daddy was at the South Street Seaport, seen here on opening day, May 2, 2011. It closed slightly over a month later.

Soul Daddy began as an idea by Jamawn Woods, a resident of Detroit, Michigan who, as a result of the poor economy, began serving chicken wings and waffles out of his home in order to support his wife and three children, as recounted in the series premiere of America's Next Great Restaurant, a reality television series on which Woods competed with other contestants to pitch restaurant concepts to investors Bobby Flay, Curtis Stone, Steve Ells and Lorena Garcia. In the second episode, the other contestants unveiled their concept at Universal CityWalk, where Woods' restaurant was called "W3's", or "Woods Wings Waffles". In the third episode, a number of the contestants, including Woods, were advised to rethink their restaurant name, and devise a slogan or philosophy, along with a signature dish that represented their ideas, which would be voted on by a large group of customers.

Jamawn Woods unveiled his revised concept as "Soul Daddy", a soul food concept that bore the slogan "Cooking with Heart & Soul", and whose signature dish was collard greens with smoked turkey, grits accentuated with parmesan cheese and nutmeg, and loaded corn bread with sautéed onion, celery and bacon, which won him majority of the customer votes that week. By the fifth episode, Woods, who had downplayed and underestimated the waffles from the dishes he had prepared in the previous episodes, re-introduced them to his menu due to the advice of the investors.

In the first-season finale, which aired on May 1, 2011, Jamawn Woods beat his two fellow finalists, Joseph Galluzzi and Sudhir Kandula, who competed against him with meatball and modern Indian cuisine concepts, respectively. Bobby Flay, one of the four judges and investors, explained Woods' victory thus: "A passion for food, a solid work ethic, good business sense and delicious meals are what the investors were searching for on this series and Jamawn embodies all of those traits and more. He is truly the heart and soul of Soul Daddy. The investors are thrilled to introduce soul food to America through these restaurants and we are confident they will savor every flavor." The restaurant's three inaugural locations, at the Mall of America in Bloomington, Minnesota, at Hollywood and Highland in Los Angeles, and at 189 Front Street in the South Street Seaport in Manhattan, opened on May 2, the day after the finale.

== Closure ==
Jamawn Woods purchased a home in Lakeville, Minnesota in order to be close to the Mall of America restaurant while undertaking a year-long management training and modifying the menu to include items such as Hoppin' John (blackeyed peas and rice), corn on the cob, and warm yams to replace the potato salad, which was not met with positive reaction by patrons. In an effort to ensure the Minneapolis restaurant's continued success, the Manhattan and Los Angeles locations were closed on June 14, 2011.

However, shortly after the restaurant's consolidation to a single market, ANGR Holdings, LLC announced on June 29 that they were closing the Bloomington, Minnesota location as well, likely signaling the end of the Soul Daddy franchise. Chipotle lost $2.4 million on Soul Daddy, with reviews blaming management and culinary advice rather than Woods's original concept. The Soul Daddy official site redirected to Chipotle Grill after the restaurant's closing. The domain was later purchased by a food blogger.

According to a September 2011 article, Woods, while on leave from his job at Chrysler, was splitting his time constructing a Soul Daddy in his hometown of Detroit and catering from his home while pursuing an associate degree at Schoolcraft College, a school in Livonia, Michigan known for its culinary arts program.

== Gallery ==
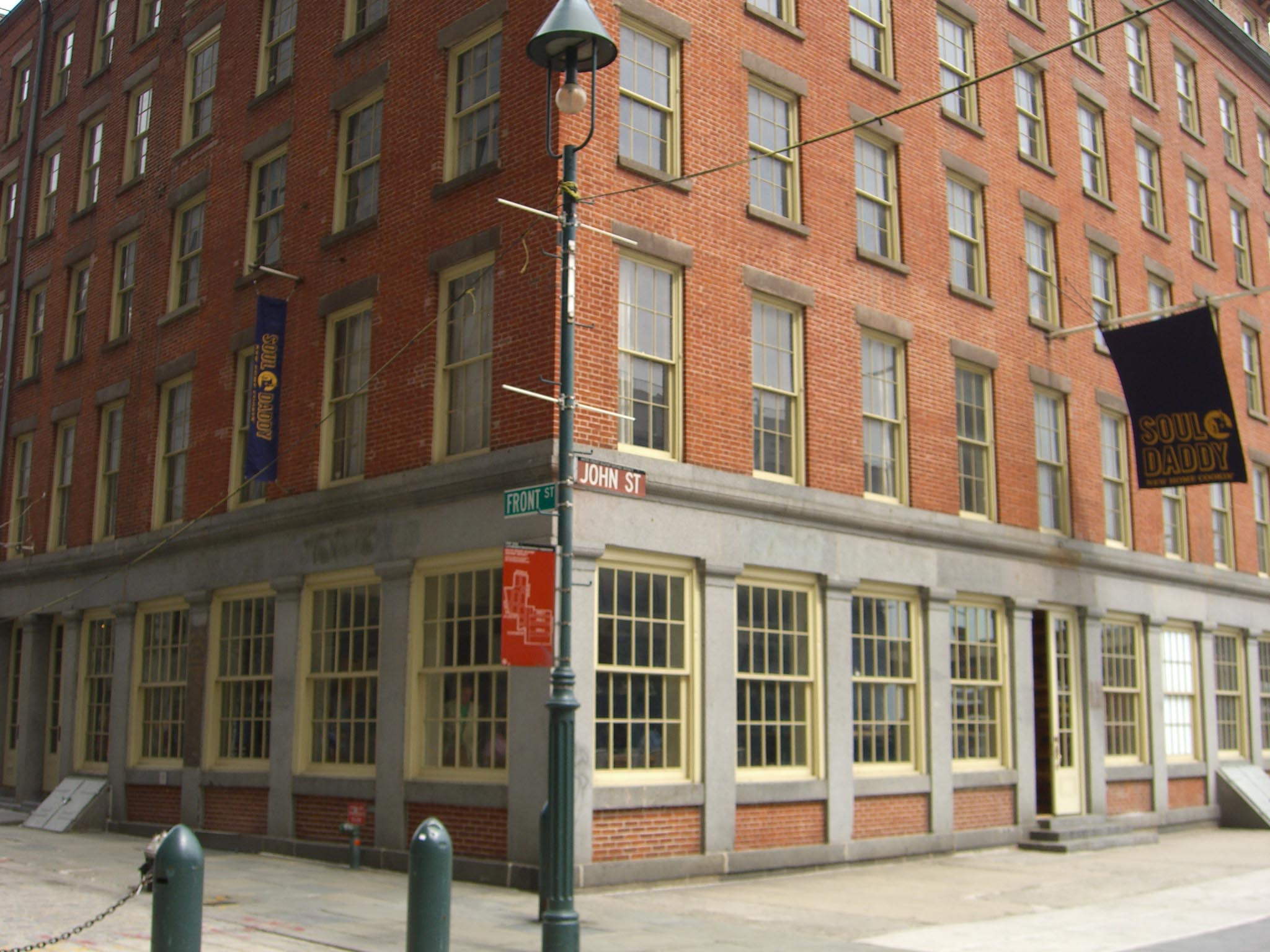
The New York City location on opening day, at the South Street Seaport

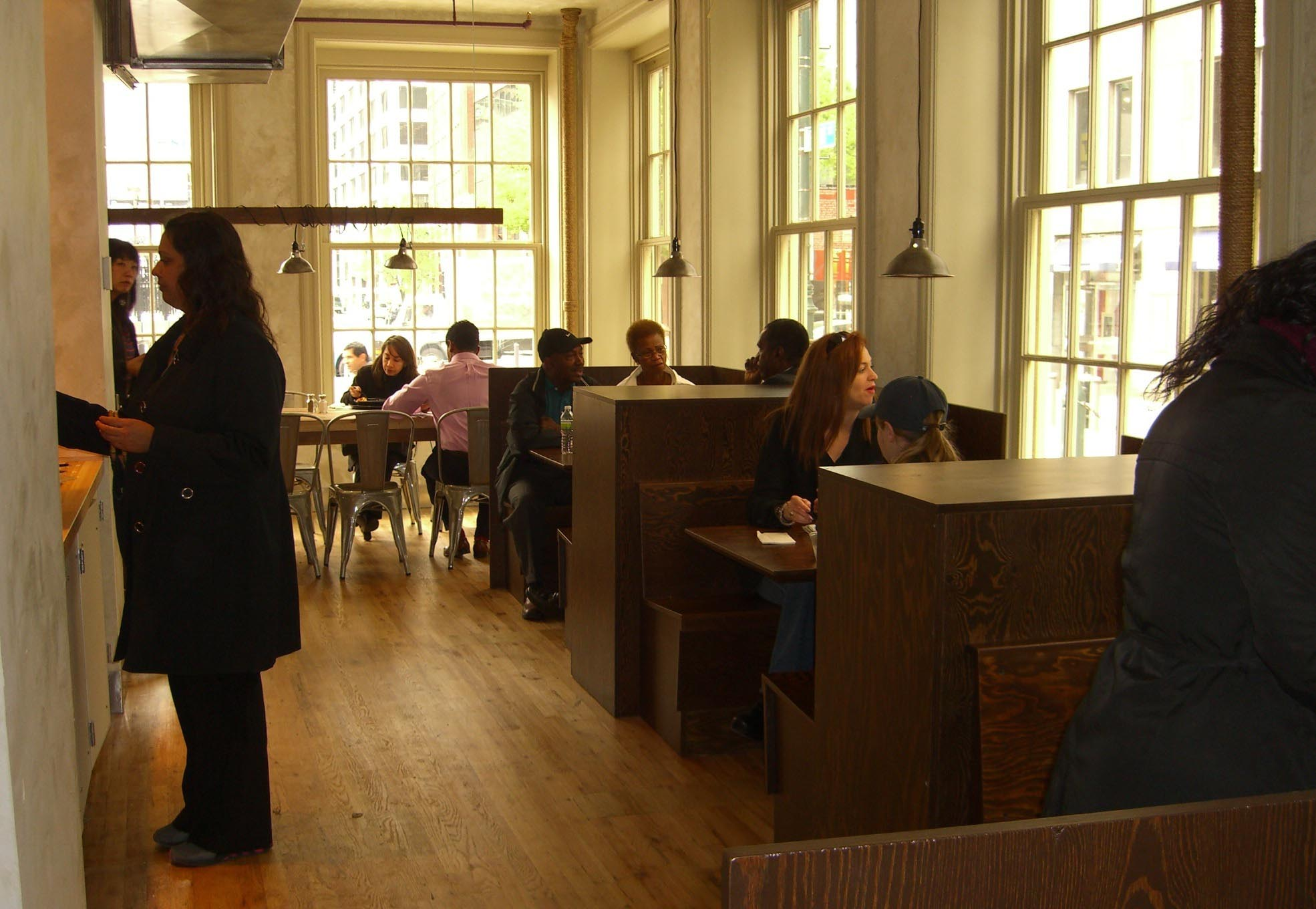
The restaurant's interior utilized wood furniture, seen here at the New York City location on opening day

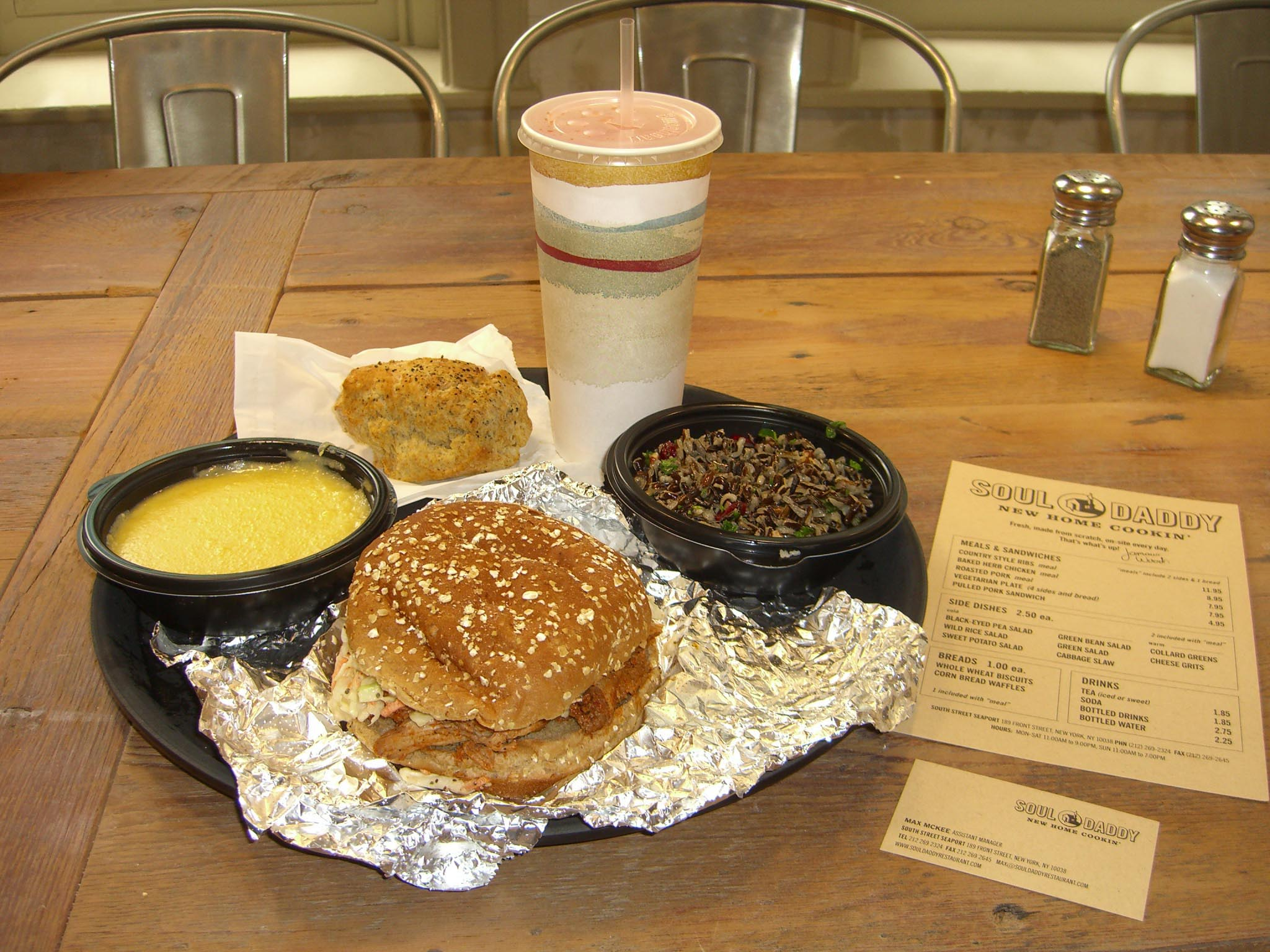
The pulled pork sandwich with cheese grits and wild rice, purchased on opening day

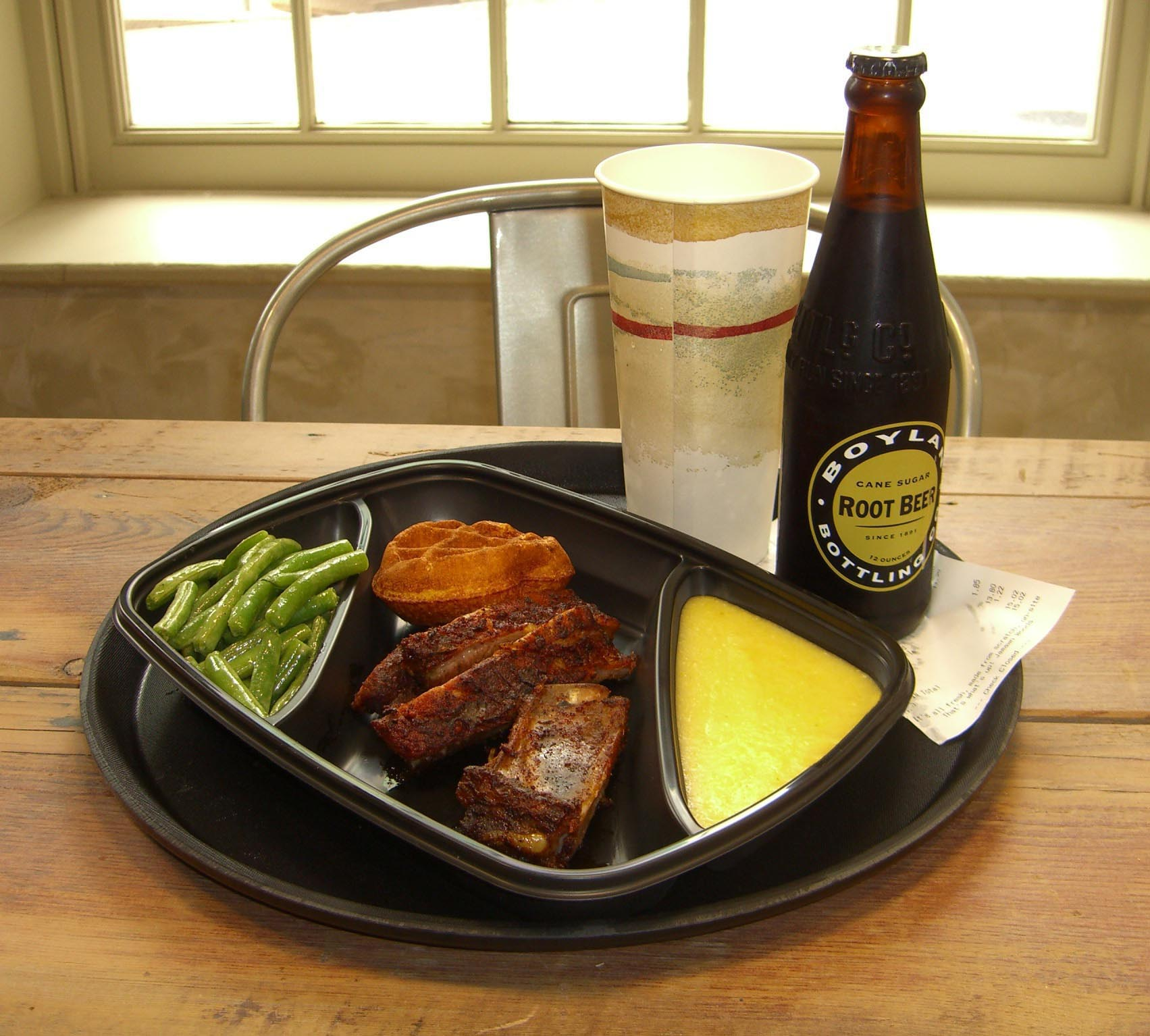
The ribs with a waffle and sides of green beans and cheese grits, purchased on opening day
