= Inside Series =

Television series

Inside Series is a set of short television movies produced by Bloomberg Television that features in-depth profiles of successful companies and their leaders. The series began streaming on Netflix in 2014.

== TV Movies ==
- Inside: Chipotle (2013) - profiles Chipotle Mexican Grill, an American restaurant chain
- Inside: De Beers (2012) - profiles De Beers diamond company
- Inside: Dolce & Gabbana (2013) - profiles Dolce & Gabbana, an Italian fashion company
- Inside: LinkedIn (2013) - profiles LinkedIn, a social networking service
- Inside Lego (2014) - officially titled Brick by Brick: Inside Lego, profiles The Lego Group, a Danish toy company
- Inside: McDonald's (2013) - profiles McDonald's, the world's largest chain of fast food hamburger restaurants
- Inside: Pixar (2013) - profiles Pixar, an American computer animation film studio owned by the Walt Disney Company
