= Lorena Garcia =

Venezuelan chef

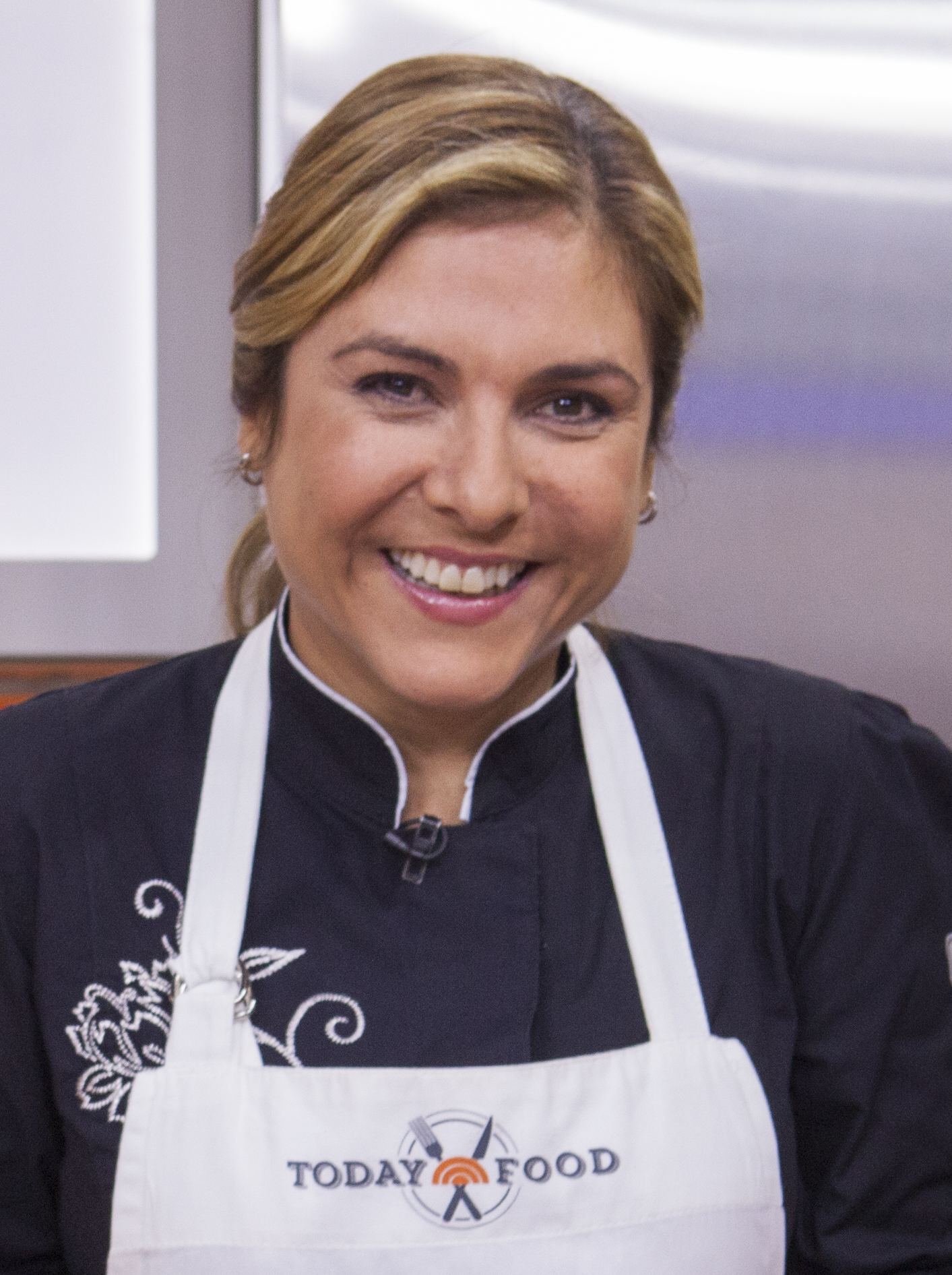
- Garcia in 2015
- Born: Caracas, Venezuela
- Education: Santa Maria University in Venezuela; Johnson and Wales University
- Website: cheflorenagarcia.com

Lorena Garcia is a Venezuelan chef who has opened multiple restaurants and became famous through appearances on multiple television shows. She is known for the restaurants she currently owns in airports across the United States, and for competing on the show Top Chef Masters. Garcia has put out her own cookbook and a line of kitchenware, while also making strides in her life to help end obesity.

== Early life ==
Born in Caracas, Venezuela, Lorena grew up around her family. Her mother is Blanca Ibáñez, a Venezuelan politician who served as secretary to former Venezuelan president Jaime Lusinchi. Ibáñez married Lusinchi in September 1991. Lusinchi was since Lorena's stepfather until his death in May 2014. As a child, she would cook for them at their family gatherings. She entertained her family by cooking for them and credits her success to these gatherings.

=== Education ===
Originally seeking to become a lawyer, Garcia attended Santa Maria University in Caracas, Venezuela and earned her law degree. She then relocated to the United States to earn an associate degree in Paralegal Studies and took a class on speaking English. However, Garcia soon sensed that her passion wasn't in the field of law and felt the need to change her career path. She decided to convert her career choice into becoming a chef and enrolled at Johnson & Wales University to earn her degree in culinary arts.

=== Cooking inspirations ===
Garcia's passion for food came from her family and their gatherings in her hometown. Her mother and her mother's perseverance inspired Garcia to expand on this passion of hers and become a chef. Garcia aimed to inspire others as well. She chose to develop nutritional programs for childhood obesity to inspire families to reduce childhood health issues. Garcia finds it to be fulfilling to watch families make changes and gain their own inspiration through her programs. Garcia's main inspiration as a chef is to bring loved ones together to enjoy wonderful food, just how it would bring her own family together.

== Career ==
=== Early culinary jobs ===
After receiving her degree in culinary arts from Johnson and Wales University, Garcia began her career as a chef through an apprenticeship at the Ritz-Carlton in Paris, France. After working at the Ritz-Carlton, Garcia went on a tour through several cities known for their culinary cuisine and landed culinary jobs in several countries, including Italy, Japan, Korea, Thailand and China. Through these jobs Garcia was able to get an exposure to world cuisine and was able to work with world-renowned chefs such as Pascal Audin.

=== Restaurants ===
==== Previous restaurants ====
In 2002, Garcia opened Food Café in Miami's Design District. Later that year, she established Elements Tierra in the Design District as well. The cuisine of the two restaurants was influenced by both Latin and Asian cooking styles. In 2008, Garcia sold both restaurants.

==== Current restaurants ====
In February 2011, Garcia accepted a job as an executive chef at the Miami International Airport. She recognized the need to provide comfort food to stressed-out travelers. To fill this need, Garcia opened up her own restaurant in the American Airlines terminal of the airport. Her restaurant, Lorena Garcia Cocina, seeks to provide diners with a healthy twist on traditional Latin Cuisine. Lorena Garcia Cocina provides travelers with dishes such as Shrimp Ceviche, Baked Empanadas, and Caribbean Jerk Chicken, in order to satisfy their cravings for nutritious and gourmet food while traveling. In August 2012, Garcia opened her second travelers' restaurant, Lorena Garcia Tapas, in the Atlanta International Airport, Delta International. Garcia has opened a third restaurant in the Dallas/ Ft. Worth Airport as of September 2016.

In May 2017, Chef Lorena paired with John Kunkel of 50 Eggs (Yardbird, Swine, etc.) to open an upscale Latin American restaurant named CHICA inside the luxurious Venetian on the Las Vegas Strip. Garcia is the first female-Latin chef to be featured on the strip.

=== Obesity campaigns ===
==== Big Chef, Little Chef ====
One thing Garcia was introduced to growing up was obesity. Living near Hispanic homes, Garcia saw it become a problem and wanted to do something about it. Garcia created "Big Chef, Little Chef", in an effort to help end the problem of childhood obesity. "Big Chef, Little Chef" is a non-profit organization that aims to encourage healthy eating starting at a young age. The foods Garcia develops for "Big Chef, Little Chef" are Hispanic foods.

==== Taco Bell's Cantina Bell Menu ====
Garcia continued her fight against obesity by working with Taco Bell. The partnership began in 2010 and progressed into major changes for Taco Bell. Garcia came to Taco Bell with hopes of creating variety within the menu. To do this, Garcia helped rework the existing menu and add 8 new ingredients to various dishes. Starting on July 5, 2012, Taco Bell implemented the new Cantina Bell menu which was largely credited to Lorena Garcia.

==== Other campaigns ====
Garcia also developed food for public schools through the organization "Alliance for a Healthier Generation" in 2011. As of spring 2014, Garcia was added as a partner with Charlotte Motor Speedway and promoted by NASCAR driver Danica Patrick in the "10 Blockbuster Days of Racing" in Charlotte, North Carolina.

== Television ==
=== Spanish television cooking shows ===
Due to her Latin upbringing and culinary skills, Garcia has been featured on numerous Spanish networks, including Telemundo, Gems, and Mundo TV, She hosted the cooking shows "Vida Gourmet", "Cocine Mundos", "De Mañanita", and "El Arte del Buen Gusto", and on the FoxLife series "Sazón con Lorena Garcia", "Lorena en su Salsa", and "El mejor de los peores." Garcia competed on Top Chef Masters, a reality competition on the network Bravo, challenging the world's leading chefs to compete against one another. Garcia ranked third among the twelve competitors on season four of the show. Garcia was also a judge on both "Cocineros al limite" and "Top Chef: Estrellas". While on "Top Chef: Estrellas", Garcia served alongside fellow chefs Jaime Martín Del Campo and Ramiro Arvizu.

=== Top Chef Masters ===
Lorena Garcia participated in the fourth season show Top Chef Masters, and she chose to compete for the organization Alliance for a Healthier Generation. Garcia made it through nine episodes, winning two quickfire competitions and two elimination challenges. Throughout the whole process Lorena was berated by other opponents for her lack of classical training. Garcia's last episode called "Old School, New School", consisted of instructing a culinary student without getting involved in the preparation, and Lorena Garcia's dish lost to Kerry Heffernan's.

=== NBC's America's Next Great Restaurant ===
Lorena Garcia participated as one of the investors and judges on NBC's "America's Next Great Restaurant". The show was also judged by chefs Curtis Stone, Bobby Flay, and Chipotle Mexican Grill founder Steve Ells. Even though the show comes from the producers of Top Chef Masters, it is not the conventional cooking show. In fact, it is a reality show where contestants are competing for investors and do not solely compete in direct cooking competitions. On May 13, 2011, NBC cancelled the show after the first season because of low ratings.

=== Other television appearances ===
Garcia's other television appearances included The Kovak Box and El C.I.D. These two screenings are the only two appearances that she did not play herself, but she did appear as herself in many other roles. Her success with food has led her to fame, as she appeared on many talk shows. She was on The Queen Latifah Show, The Talk, Guy's Grocery Games, The Chew, The Wendy Williams Show, and The Biggest Loser. She was a guest judge in season 3 of Tournament of Champions. She also played a semi-fictionalized version of herself in several episodes of the Nickelodeon show Talia in the Kitchen.

== Products ==
=== Books ===
Lorena Garcia has many recipes, and she compiled many of those into a cookbook. That book is entitled "Lorena Garcia's New Latin Classics". The hard cover book is 256 pages long of recipes of Latin cuisines, usually featuring ingredients such as beans, rice, and salsa. She is also the author of "Lorena Garcia's New Taco Classics" (2015).

=== Kitchenware ===
On November 14, 2013, Lorena, along with Ingenious Design's president, Joy Mangano, released their line of new kitchenware, the Lorena Bella Kitchen Collection. Some items included on the Lorena Bella Kitchen Collection for HSN include cookware with Technolon +, Corningware oven to tabletop serveware, and a plethora of smart accessories.

On October 14, 2016, Lorena launched an international reality show called Food Hunters, a cooking competition for children in which teams from Latin America compete for culinary scholarships. The show concluded on January 15, 2017.

In 2022, Garcia was an honoree by the Carnegie Corporation of New York's Great Immigrant Award.
