= America's Next Great Restaurant =

- Starring: Bobby Flay; Curtis Stone; Steve Ells; Lorena Garcia
- Country of origin: United States
- No. of episodes: 9

Production
- Running time: 60 minutes

Original release
- Network: NBC; CNBC
- Release: March 6 – May 1, 2011

America's Next Great Restaurant is an NBC reality television show featuring contestants pitching restaurant ideas to a panel of judges, where the winner receives financial backing for their restaurant concept. Three locations were opened across the nation — Los Angeles, Minneapolis, and New York—on Monday, May 2, 2011, the day after the May 1 season finale. The judges included chefs Curtis Stone, Bobby Flay, Lorena Garcia, and Chipotle Mexican Grill founder Steve Ells, who were the investors in the winning concept. The production company behind the show was Magical Elves, the same company that produces Top Chef. The show, which has been described as a cross between The Apprentice and Top Chef, premiered on March 6, 2011. The first-season finale aired on Sunday, May 1, 2011, with Jamawn Woods' concept, a soul food restaurant concept called Soul Daddy, judged the winner.

The season finale, which drew a 2.0 viewership rating, was rebroadcast on May 6, as viewers in the Pacific Time Zone did not learn the winner during the original broadcast, due to the breaking news of the death of Osama bin Laden.

Due to low ratings, on May 13, 2011, NBC cancelled the show after the first season.

The three Soul Daddy restaurants that were opened (in Minneapolis, Manhattan and Los Angeles) closed within two months of their May 2, 2011 grand opening.

== Contestants ==
Contestant and Age	Hometown	Occupation	Original Restaurant Name	Changed Name	Slogan	Restaurant Concept	Eliminated
Jamawn Woods, 32	Detroit, Michigan	Self-employed cook	W3 - Woods' Wings & Waffles	Soul Daddy	Cooking With Heart And Soul	soul food	Winner
Sudhir Kandula, 40	New York City, New York	Software Sales	The Tiffin Box	Spice Coast	Eat Flavorfully	modern Indian cuisine	Runner-Up
Joey Galluzzi, 40	Brooklyn, New York	Financial services	Saucy Balls	Brooklyn Meatball Company	Italian Home Cooking, Fresh Is Best	meatballs	Runner-Up
Stephenie Park, 28	Chicago, Illinois	Attorney	Compleat	Harvest Sol	Flavor You Can Count On	healthy meals / Mediterranean cuisine	Episode 9
Greg Westcott/Krystal Seymour, 30/29	Los Angeles, California	Bartender/Personal Trainer	Hick's	Grill'Billies	Urban Grill With Southern Attitude; Be The Sauce	Southern comfort food / grilling	Episode 8
Sandy DiGiovanni, 54	Kansas City, Missouri	Bartender	Limbo	Sinners and Saints	Food For Your Mood	choice of healthy or indulgent dishes	Episode 6
Eric Powell, 28	Nashville, Tennessee	Financial Manager	Meltworks		Artisanal Ingredients, Endless Possibilities	grilled cheese	Episode 5
Alex Terranova, 28	Marina del Rey, California	Restaurant Manager	Hard 'N Soft A Taco Bar	Revolution Tacos	Explore, Discover, Indulge	fusion tacos	Episode 4
Marisa Zafran, 31	New York City, New York	Director of PR/Marketing	Wok	Chǎo	The Art of Stir Fry	stir-fry	Episode 3
Fran Harris, 45	Dallas, Texas	Personal trainer	The Sports Wrap			healthy sports wrap	Episode 2
Sarah Schier		Private chef	What's Good			organic and healthy	Episode 1
Aimee Kyriss, 29	Denver, Colorado	The POO Crew, LLC co-owner	SoupZ			fast, healthy, raw, made-to-order soups	Episode 1
Brianne Teevan		Educator	Café crEATivi			interactive cafe for kids	Episode 1
Kevin Tran/Viet Tran			Nam Nam			Vietnamese	Episode 1
Anita Curran		Restaurant manager	Pot Belly			pot pies	Episode 1
Joe Barker		Big Wangs Restaurant Chain Owner	Lil' Wangs			wings	Episode 1
Jason Macioge		Restaurant owner	Bully's Burgers & Wings			burgers and wings	Episode 1
Anastasia Alexander			Giggling Greek Tavernia			Greek	Episode 1
William "Win" Bruce			Mix It Up Sandwiches				Episode 1
Farzan Fatehi	Houston, Texas	Abe's Cajun Market Manager	Sina			Persian	Episode 1
Shannon Klepper	Tiffin, Ohio			Con Gusto		Spanish	Episode 1

== Episode elimination chart ==
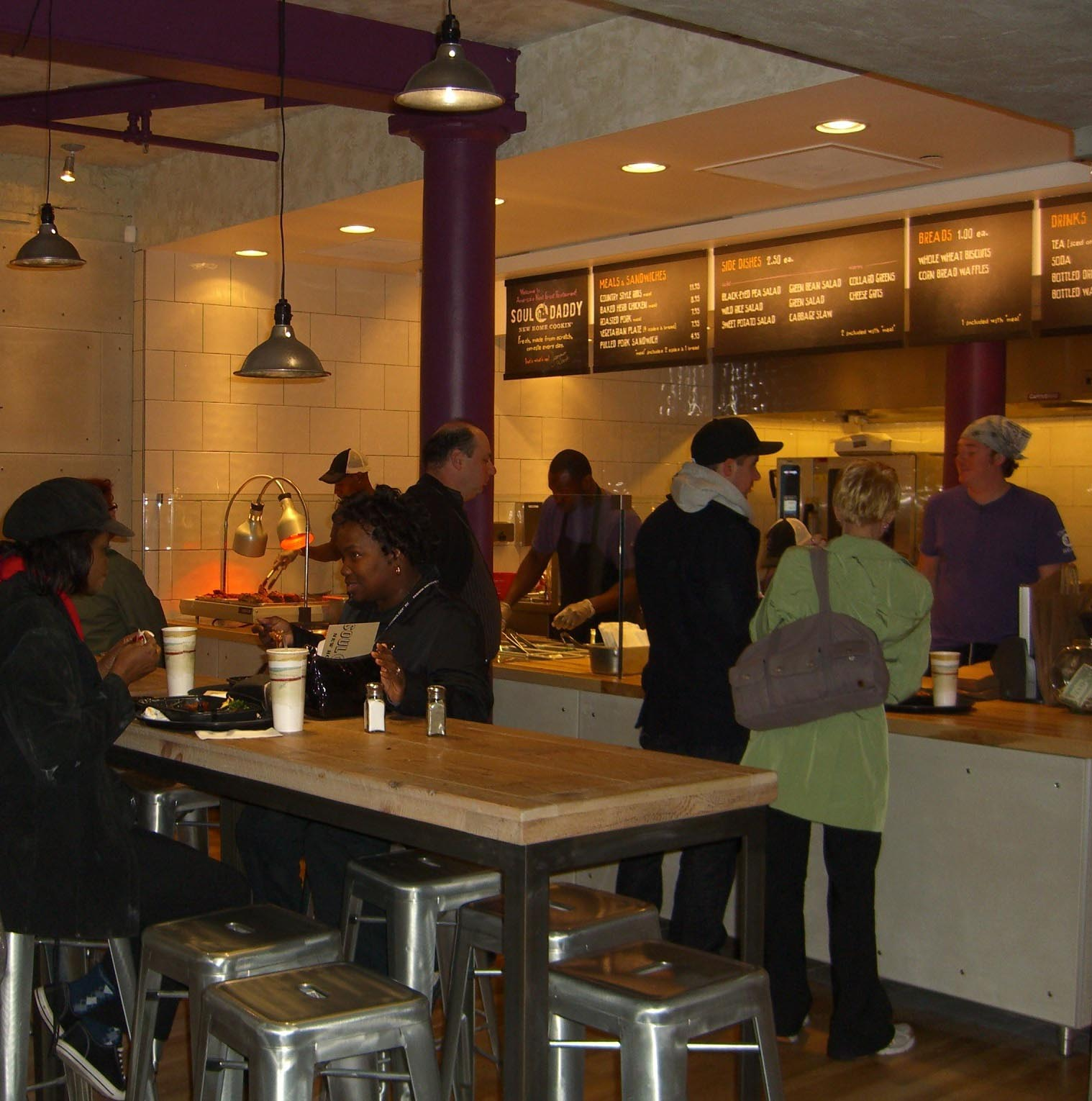
Jawan Woods' Soul Daddy concept was the competition's winner, seen here on opening day, May 2, 2011 at the New York City location. The location closed permanently on June 14, 2011.

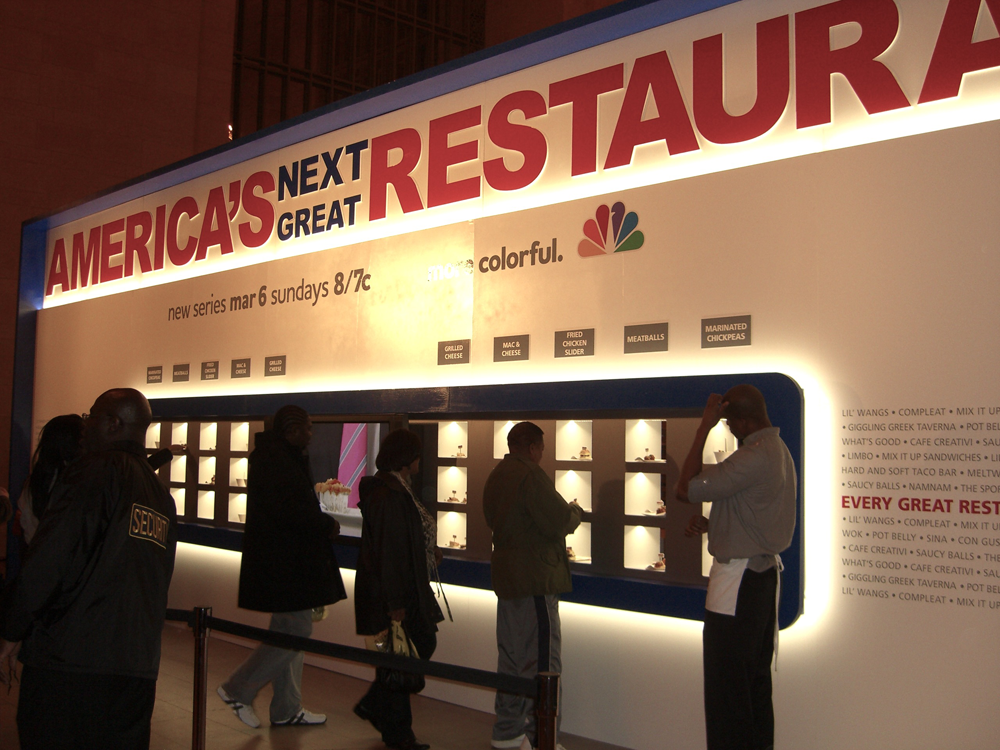
Commuters in Grand Central Terminal in Manhattan treated to free samples of food inspired by the series, March 4, 2011

Place	Contestant	Episode									
Place	Contestant	1	2	3	4	5	6	7	8	9	10
1	Jamawn	Top 10	IN	WIN	IN	IN	WIN	IN	LOW	WIN	WINNER
T-2	Sudhir	Top 10	IN	IN	WIN	IN	IN	WIN	LOW	IN	RUNNER-UP
T-2	Joey	Top 10	IN	IN	LOW	LOW	LOW	LOW	WIN	LOW	RUNNER-UP
4	Stephenie	Top 10	IN	LOW	IN	IN	LOW	IN	IN	OUT	
5	Greg/Krystal	Top 10	LOW	LOW	IN	WIN	IN	LOW	OUT		
6	Sandy	Top 10	IN	IN	IN	LOW	OUT				
7	Eric	Top 10	WIN	IN	LOW	OUT					
8	Alex	Top 10	IN	IN	OUT						
9	Marisa	Top 10	LOW	OUT							
10	Fran	Top 10	OUT								
11	Jason	OUT									
T12-21	Sarah	OUT									
T12-21	Aimee	OUT									
T12-21	Brianne	OUT									
T12-21	Tran	OUT									
T12-21	Anita	OUT									
T12-21	Joe B.	OUT									
T12-21	Anastasia	OUT									
T12-21	Win	OUT									
T12-21	Farzen	OUT									
T12-21	Shannon	OUT									

Episode 7 was an unaired episode that had contestants create a mini-website.

The contestant was the winner of America's Next Great Restaurant and won three restaurants in three cities across the country.
The contestant(s) were the runners-up of America's Next Great Restaurant.
The contestant won the challenge for the week.
The contestant made it into the Top 10.
The contestant was safe from elimination but did not win the challenge of the week.
The contestant was in the bottom group for the week.
The contestant was eliminated.

== Episodes ==
Each episode combines a business challenge with a food challenge.

No.	Title	Original release date
1	"Pilot"	March 6, 2011
The 21 preliminary contestants make their presentations to the judges on their restaurant concepts, and prepare sample dishes they would serve in their restaurant. After watching the presentations and tasting the dishes, the judges choose nine contestants (Alex, Fran, Greg and Krystal, Jamawn, Joseph, Marisa, Sandy, Stephenie, and Sudhir) to compete for the opportunity to have their concept opened as a restaurant in three locations. Eric and Jason have an extra demonstration to determine who gets the last spot. Eric has to make as many grilled cheese sandwiches as he can, and Jason has to make a great burger. With Eric making 29 sandwiches in fifteen minutes and Jason's burger being merely satisfactory, the judges place Eric in the final spot.
2	"Episode 2"	March 13, 2011
The contestants must create a logo for their company and hire a chef. The challenge this week includes serving a dish to 1000 people at Universal CityWalk Hollywood. Each person who samples the contestants' dishes is given a silver coin to put into one contestant's jar. The contestant with the most coins is the winner and safe from elimination. Winner: Eric, for acquiring the most silver coins from the 1000 tasters. Eliminated: Fran, for being too stubborn and not listening to the investors.
3	"Episode 3"	March 20, 2011
The nine remaining contestants must work the busy lunch shift at Chipotle Mexican Grill. All but Meltworks and Saucy Balls are directed to change their names, and each must come up with a slogan. All but Stephenie (Compleat) do so. For the food evaluation, each contestant must make a signature dish based on the slogan. Sudhir and Marisa are advised to consider firing their chefs. Sudhir does so, and takes over as head chef while hiring a sous chef, but Marisa stays with her chef. The evaluators include some of the country's top advertising executives. Flay recommends to Eric that he come up with some dipping sauces for his grilled cheese sandwiches. Winner: Jamawn, for acquiring the most silver coins from evaluators. Eliminated: Marisa, for not firing her chef, and for not getting her food concept to work practically.
4	"Episode 4"	March 27, 2011
The eight remaining contestants must design and construct a smaller design of their proposed eatery and menu board, which they unveil for Dine Los Angeles event attendees. Stephenie changes her restaurant name to Harvest Sol. Eric does not follow Flay's last episode's recommendations to make dipping sauces. Winner: Sudhir, for acquiring the most silver coins from evaluators. Eliminated: Alex, since the investors felt his ideas and concepts were better suited to a bar rather than a casual restaurant.
5	"Episode 5"	April 3, 2011
The seven remaining contestants must design a uniform for their proposed eatery and do a photo shoot with the uniform. For the food challenge, the investors propose a dish which is either not yet made, or might fill a gap on the menu. Flay pushes the sauce idea on Eric again, which he does this time, but not to Flay's liking. Winner: Greg and Krystal, for acquiring the most silver coins from evaluators. Eliminated: Eric, for not being flexible with his preconceived concept, and for not implementing the investors' wishes properly.
6	"Episode 6"	April 10, 2011
The six remaining contestants must design a food truck and sell their food to pedestrians at one of two locations. With a $300 budget, the task is to figure out their food cost, set their prices, and make the most profit they can. Joey finally changes his restaurant's name to Brooklyn Meatball Company. Sudhir takes Ells' advice to put a taco on the menu. Sandy fires her chef, based on the investors' advice. Winner: Jamawn; although no contestant made a profit, Jamawn took in the most money. Eliminated: Sandy, for not being able to serve tasty enough food, and for not being able to properly implement her concept.
7	"Episode 7"	April 17, 2011
The five remaining contestants must make food appropriate for children, and develop a toy for their restaurant. Stone and Garcia make an initial test of the food for the contestants, so they can modify it before the evaluation to make it more healthy or less spicy. Grill'billies argue with their cook and later lose half their food in a spill. The tasters are revealed to be families, one of whom is Flay's daughter. Winner: Joey, for receiving the most coins from the kids, a total of 52% of the votes. Eliminated: Greg and Krystal, for not being able to control their concept due to a lack of hierarchy.
8	"Episode 8 (Venture in Vegas)"	April 24, 2011
The four remaining contestants head to Las Vegas, to test their concepts somewhere other than Los Angeles. They are put up in a luxury suite at Caesar's Palace, whose guests will be the testers, two of whom are Penn & Teller. The contestants serve three dishes to the crowd. For the business challenge, the contestants hire their next two employees, who will handle the first hour of serving without the contestants' help. Stephenie's staff is unable to identify the dishes as they spend more time prepping. She also adds lamb to an item after researching the treatment of lamb in America. Winner: Jamawn, for getting the most coins Eliminated: Stephenie, for not having a good focus on what her concept is.
9	"Episode 9 (Finale)"	May 1, 2011
The remaining three contestants are to build a mini-restaurant in the former restaurant row area. The mini-restaurants are to mimic a soft opening. Although the judges agree that Spice Coast's food is good, they feel that Sudhir has imitated the Chipotle Mexican Grill concept too much in the number of Tex-Mex style items he has added to his menu. The customers and judges also feel Brooklyn Meatball Company's food is excellent, but they must wait too long for it, as that restaurant's problem organizing legible tickets leads to a backup. Soul Daddy's food is also a success, though Bobby Flay is disappointed that Jamawn has replaced his fried chicken with baked chicken in order to provide a more healthy menu choice, and Lorena Garcia feels his food is too rich to eat more than once a week. This episode was preempted in the Pacific Time Zone due to coverage of the death of Osama bin Laden. Winner: Soul Daddy Runners-up: Spice Coast, Brooklyn Meatball Company

== Opened restaurants ==
ANGR Holdings is the company that ran Soul Daddy's restaurants. It also holds registered trademarks on several of the other restaurant concepts' names (marked ® in the first table above). The Minneapolis Soul Daddy was housed in the Mall of America, while the Manhattan location was at the South Street Seaport, at 189 Front Street. The Los Angeles restaurant was located at Hollywood and Highland, in the same grand center as the Kodak Theatre. On June 14, 2011, the Manhattan and Los Angeles locations were closed in order for Woods to focus on the Minneapolis location, which itself closed on June 28. Woods was vocal in blaming Chipotle's management team for the failure of the chain, and said that the company owed him a year's salary. He reached a settlement with Chipotle by September 27 of that year.

As of early October 2011 the top three contestants were all working on opening restaurants based on their Next Great Restaurant concepts. While on leave from his job at Chrysler, Woods split his time constructing a Soul Daddy in his hometown of Detroit, while catering from his home and pursuing an associate's degree at Schoolcraft College, a school in Livonia, Michigan known for its culinary arts program. Runner-up Joey Galluzzi intended to pursue his restaurant concept, and enrolled in the Culinary Arts program at Le Cordon Bleu to improve his knowledge of the business. Runner-up Sudhir Kandula joined a San Francisco-based start-up called eCert, Inc. as their vice president of sales, advised a friend on his software/food venture called GlassCart, and worked with friends on a stealth food project called American Dirt.

Of all of the contestants, Galluzzi was the only contestant that had successfully opened a restaurant based on his original concept and that business had operated continuously for more than five years.
