= Maurizio Antoninetti =

- Maurizio Antoninetti in undated photo
- Born: October 7, 1956
- Died: May 9, 2011 (aged 54)

Maurizio Antoninetti (October 7, 1956 – May 9, 2011) was an Italian-American man known for being the plaintiff in several lawsuits concerning accommodations for people with disabilities. Antonienetti filed suit against Chipotle Mexican Grill, Inc., claiming that the height of the counters at their restaurants blocked his view of the menu from his wheelchair, thus depriving him of the "Chipotle experience". A federal judge initially ruled against Antoninetti, saying Antoninetti had sued dozens of other places for access violations only to drop the suits after receiving cash settlements. However, the United States Court of Appeals for the Ninth Circuit ruled in favor of Antonietti, and ordered Chipotle to lower the height of their counters. After immigrating to the United States in 1990, Antoninetti filed lawsuits against over 20 businesses over service quality, only one of which he ever visited afterward.

== See also ==
- Americans with Disabilities Act of 1990
- ADA Compliance Kit
- American Disability rights movement
- Convention on the Rights of Persons with Disabilities
- Frivolous lawsuit
- Ambulance chaser
