= Steve Ells =

American businessman (born 1965)

- Born: September 12, 1965 (age 61); Indianapolis, Indiana, U.S.
- Education: University of Colorado at Boulder (B.A.); Culinary Institute of America
- Years active: 1993–2020
- Known for: Founding Chipotle Mexican Grill

Steve Ells (born September 12, 1965) is an American businessman. He is the founder, former chief executive officer, and former executive chairman of Chipotle Mexican Grill. Ells founded Chipotle in 1993, and under his direction, the chain serves what it describes as "naturally raised meat" and promotes sustainable agriculture.

In November 2017, Chipotle announced Ells' resignation as CEO, pending the search for a new CEO with "turnaround expertise". Ells was executive chairman following the appointment of a new CEO, and was on the CEO search committee. Brian Niccol became CEO of Chipotle in February 2018. In March 2020, Ells resigned as chairman and left the board of directors, breaking his final ties to the company.

== Early life ==
Ells was born in Indianapolis on September 12, 1965, the son of a pharmaceutical executive. He attended Boulder High School and the University of Colorado at Boulder where he received a bachelor's degree in Art History and became a member of the Delta Chi fraternity. Ells later enrolled at the Culinary Institute of America in Hyde Park, New York, graduating in 1990.

== Career ==
Ells worked for two years as a sous chef under Jeremiah Tower at Stars restaurant in San Francisco prior to launching Chipotle. Ells opened a chipotle themed taco store in Denver, Colorado near the University of Denver campus using $85,000 borrowed from his family and friends. Ells was CEO of the chain from 1993 until 2009, when he split co-CEO duties with Monty Moran. Ells returned as sole CEO on December 12, 2016, upon Moran's retirement. In 2007, Ells received the CEO of the Year Award from ColoradoBiz magazine. He formerly sat on the board of directors of the Land Institute.

In 2010, Ells joined the judging and investment panel on NBC's series America's Next Great Restaurant alongside Bobby Flay, Curtis Stone and Lorena Garcia. Ells had not previously watched reality television and was disillusioned with the experience.

Chipotle announced on November 29, 2017, that Ells would step down as CEO following the appointment of a new CEO with "turnaround expertise." Ells was executive chairman after the new CEO appointment, and was on the CEO search committee with fellow Chipotle board members Robin Hickenlooper and Ali Namvar. Ells left the company in March 2020.

In May 2025, Forbes reported that Ells had become a billionaire 32 years after founding Chipotle.

After leaving Chipotle, Ells returned to the restaurant industry with Kernel, a New York City fast casual concept that opened in 2024 and used automation in its operations. In 2025, Ells replaced Kernel with Counter Service, a sandwich restaurant. By July 2026, Counter Service had grown to five locations and was preparing to expand outside of New York City

== Controversies ==
Ells has received criticism over his salary. In 2013, The New York Times reported he was paid $25.1 million, more than equivalent executives in companies like Ford, Boeing, and AT&T. By the early 2010s, Ells and his co-CEO, Montgomery Moran, were paid more than $300 million. In May 2014, shareholders rejected a plan to further increase the executives' wages.
