= KIIS =

KIIS may refer to:

- KIIS-FM, a radio station (102.7 FM) licensed to Los Angeles, California, United States
- KIIS Network, a network of Australian radio stations including:
  - KIIS 106.5, Greater Sydney area
  - KIIS 101.1, Greater Melbourne area
  - KIIS 97.3, Greater Brisbane area
- KIIS Extra 95.8, a Greek radio station
- KIIS (Thousand Oaks, California), a defunct radio station (850 AM) formerly licensed to serve Thousand Oaks, California, which held the call sign KIIS from 2003 to 2005
- KEIB, a radio station (1150 AM) licensed to serve Los Angeles, California, that held the call sign KIIS from 1970 to 1980 and from 1984 to 1997
- Kentucky Institute for International Studies
- Kyiv International Institute of Sociology
