= Percy Jewett Burrell =

American dramatist (1877–1964)

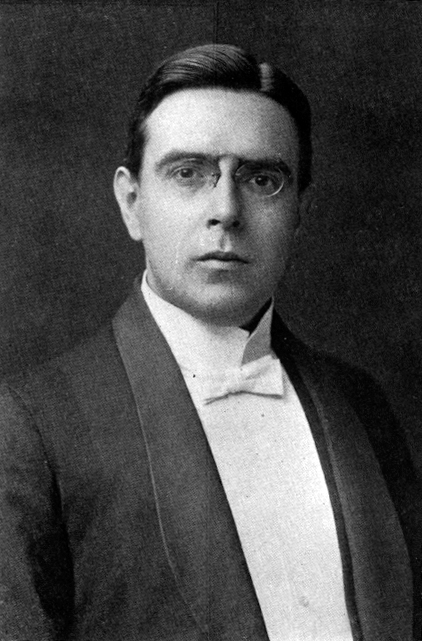
- Born: February 10, 1877; Boston, Massachusetts, U.S.
- Died: March 22, 1964 (aged 87)
- Resting place: Ridgelawn Cemetery (Watertown, Massachusetts)
- Education: New England Conservatory of Music, Boston University
- Occupations: Teacher of Oratory, Elocution, and Drama; Head of the Community Service, Inc. Bureaus of Educational Dramatics (as of 1922)
- Employer(s): Community Service, Inc. (as of 1922)
- Known for: Director of Civic and Historical Pageants; Pioneer Leader of Phi Mu Alpha Sinfonia Fraternity
- Title: First Supreme Historian of Phi Mu Alpha Sinfonia Fraternity (1901-1903); Sixth Supreme President of Phi Mu Alpha Sinfonia Fraternity (1907–1914); Trustee, New England Conservatory of Music, c. 1915
- Political party: Republican

Percy Jewett Burrell (February 10, 1877 – March 22, 1964) was an American author and director of historical and civic pageants. Known for his skills in oratory and elocution, he also taught public speaking and drama, and was known as a "public reciter." A native and lifelong resident of the greater Boston area, he was described by Time magazine as a "professional director of civic and patriotic shows." By the mid-1920s, Burrell had developed a nationwide reputation for his work, having had 75,000 participants in his productions, which had collectively been performed in front of over 900,000 people. According to a printed program used at a service in his memory, "His mastery of the spoken and written word led him to be a well known public speaker with an enviable reputation as a teacher of oratory, and later as an author and director of national distinction."

Burrell served as the first supreme historian of Phi Mu Alpha Sinfonia Fraternity from 1901 to 1903, and the sixth supreme (national) president of Phi Mu Alpha Sinfonia fraternity from 1907 to 1914, and along with fraternity founder Ossian E. Mills has been credited by fraternity historians with encouraging the early expansion of and formulating the basic ideals espoused by the fraternity. Much of this fundamental philosophy is encapsulated in his presidential messages expounding the fraternity's Object, which appeared in the Sinfonia Yearbooks between 1908 and 1910. Today, these writings are regularly used to instruct the fraternity's probationary members about the fraternity's Object, and the obligations and expectations of fraternity membership.

== Early life and education ==
Born to Joseph and Alice Burrell of the Beacon Hill area of Boston on February 10, 1877, Percy Burrell attended the Phillips Grammar School in Boston, from which he graduated in 1891, and the English High School of Boston, from which he graduated in 1894.

He studied oratory at the New England Conservatory of Music in Boston, graduating with a Diploma in Elocution in 1896. He later received the post-graduate degree of Bachelor of Oratory (B.O.) from Boston University, where he later took coursework in Methodist theology, and was initiated into Boston University's chapter of Beta Theta Pi fraternity.

Burrell maintained a connection to the New England Conservatory for many years. He was called upon to serve as commencement speaker at the Conservatory in 1908, and was published several times in the New England Conservatory Quarterly. His writings at that time advocated the teaching of oratory in the public schools. In 1897, he had published a sixteen-page work entitled Oratory in the Public Schools. As of 1910, Burrell was serving as a trustee of the conservatory. As of 1951, Burrell was serving as an associate editor of Alumni Opus, a publication of the New England Conservatory Alumni Association.

== Early leadership in Phi Mu Alpha Sinfonia Fraternity ==
Burrell was initiated into Phi Mu Alpha Sinfonia's Alpha Chapter at the New England Conservatory on June 12, 1899, and soon thereafter was elected as the chapter's second president in January 1900. His leadership was significant as the fraternity had only recently been founded at the Conservatory fifteen months earlier, during the previous school year in October 1898; it would not be until later, in 1901, that a National or "Supreme" President would be elected. Thus, he was in a position to influence the direction of the fraternity as it grew from the campus of the conservatory to other campuses, initially to the Broad Street Conservatory in Philadelphia, Pennsylvania and the American Institute of Applied Arts in New York City, New York in the fall of 1900.

He served as Supreme (or National) Historian from 1901 to 1903. At the seventh national convention, held in Boston in 1907, he was elected Supreme President, and served in this role until 1914. Serving as president for seven years, he holds the third longest tenure in this role, behind Richard Crosby (nine years, non-consecutive) and Archie N. Jones (ten years, consecutive).

During the years of his supreme presidency, the Fraternity expanded to include chapters at the University of Missouri, Northwestern University, Peabody Conservatory of Music, De Pauw University, the University of Oklahoma, Denison University, the Cincinnati Conservatory of Music, and the University of Kansas. For more specific information on the specific chapters and campuses involved, see Chapters of Phi Mu Alpha Sinfonia. During this period, the modern pin was adopted, the coat-of-arms was adopted, the first pledge pin was adopted, and the membership shingle was adopted. Protocol for the appropriate manner by which to wear the Fraternity pin was established in 1909 and the Fraternity's composition contest was launched in 1912.

Burrell also wrote the lyrics to the song "The Mystic Cat", with music composed by American composer George Whitefield Chadwick, director of the New England Conservatory from 1897 to 1930 and the second honorary member of the fraternity, which appeared in the 1908 edition of the Fraternity's songbook, the first such book issued by the Fraternity. He also wrote the lyrics to the song "Alma Mater" for the 1914 edition of the songbook, with music by fellow Alpha Chapter brother Charles H. Doersam.

He was listed in the 1915 edition of Leading Greeks: An Encyclopedia of the Workers in the American College Fraternities and Sororities, edited by William Collin Levere.

== Professional accomplishments ==
In his book American Historical Pageantry: The Uses of Tradition in the Early Twentieth Century, David Glassberg notes that Burrell was one of thirteen dramatists employed as field workers by the Department of Community Drama in a program called Community Service, Inc. Such field workers helped local Community Service "chapters establish amateur dramatic programs." Burrell was affiliated with this program as of 1921. According to Martha Candler's book Drama in Religious Service (1922), Burrell helped conduct six-week drama institutes in Boston and New York for those involved in church related drama.

From approximately 1917 to 1945, Burrell was in high demand throughout the United States and, according to Mongiovi, "stood preeminent in his profession as a consultant, author, organizer and director of historical and patriotic pageants and community and religious drama" by the 1930s. Dr. Albert Bushnell Hart, Professor-Emeritus of History at Harvard University called Burrell “the master pageant-master,” and fellow American dramatist Percy MacKaye said of Burrell, “I know of no other person who combines his mastery of minutiae with the kind of human idealism necessary for projecting such phases of community art.”

Burrell's historically themed pageants were often performed outdoors in stadiums, football fields, and even on battlefields. The topic was usually related to a significant historical milestone of the city or region in which the pageant was produced. His works might be considered predecessors to the outdoor dramas that Kermit Hunter, author of Unto These Hills and Horn in the West, and Paul Green, author of The Lost Colony, were later known for. Although his work took him throughout the country, much of his work was centered in New England and surrounding states. According to David Walbert, Burrell's works utilized "classical allusion and poetry to edify as well as entertain audiences." Walbert further described Burrell's pageants as productions that should "transform a 'city of strangers' into a 'community of neighbors' - a genteel alternative to the '100% Americanism' of the early 1920s that sparked divisiveness and xenophobia in the wake of the First World War. Instead of warding off dangerous outsiders, historical pageants stressed unity and identification with community by building pride in common achievement."

One of Burrell's first works was Hope Valley, which was described as a "rural musical play" and a "charming musical comedy" set in a New England country village, was premiered at the New England Conservatory in April 1910 ([ibid.]).

According to Glassberg, Burrell began to gain a reputation in the 1910s directing pageants of a religious nature (Glassberg, p. 235). Burrell collaborated with Oliver Huckel in 1913 on Four Epochs of World Conquest, a work designed to support participants in the pageant "The Pageant of Darkness and Light."

Among his early works are The Pioneer Pageant: How the West Was Won (1924), which was a collaboration with Stephen B. L. Penrose (then president of Whitman College), and was produced in Walla Walla, Washington. The Pageant of Saratoga, produced on October 8, 1927, on the Saratoga, New York battlefield, had 6,500 participants and 125,000 spectators making it "the largest historical spectacle of its type ever given in the country at the time." The Pageant of Wyoming Valley was produced in 1928 to commemorate the one-hundred-fiftieth anniversary of the Battle of Wyoming. The Pageant of New Brunswick: the Drama on the Highway was produced at Rutgers University in October 1930.

Burrell produced Pageant of Colorado, a work with music composed by Charles Wakefield Cadman, in Denver, Colorado in May 1927. Also that year, he produced The York Pageant: How the American Federation Was Founded, in collaboration with Lillian White Spencer and Alice Kraft. Burrell produced two pageants during the 1920s at Franklin and Marshall College in Lancaster, Pennsylvania. The Pageant of Liberty: Commemorating Lancaster Pennsylvania in the American Revolution was produced in July 1926 on the one-hundred-fiftieth anniversary of the signing of the Declaration of Independence. Described as a “stupendous historical spectacle”, the work depicted Lancaster's role in the fight for independence. The York Pageant was produced in York, Pennsylvania, in 1927. The Pageant of Gratitude: For two hundred years of blessing upon Lancaster County was a ten-act work produced in June 1929. Written and directed by Burrell in collaboration with Alice Kraft and Harry A. Sykes, the production featured over 3,000 participants and included drama, dance, and music. The pageant is described in detail in David Walbert's book Garden Spot: Lancaster County, the Old Order Amish, and the Settling of Rural America. In 1929, Burrell served as general director of New York State's one-hundred-fiftieth anniversary Sullivan Expedition pageants.

By the 1930s, over 100,000 persons had come under his guidance as pageant participants and committee members, and over 1,200,000 spectators had seen his productions. During the 1930s, he authored Pageant of Time: An Adventure of Education in the Realm of Leisure; an allegory (1930). In 1930, he served as pageantry advisor for the Massachusetts Bay Tercentenary. In 1932, he served as a pageant consultant to the United States Commission on the two-hundredth anniversary of the birth of George Washington. In 1934, he adapted Matthew Page Andrews' Soul of Maryland:Pageant of the Founding for performance in Baltimore Stadium (Library of Congress Catalog). The work was a celebration of the "sesqui-centennial of Methodism." In 1935 he authored America’s Making in Connecticut (the more complete title of which is The Connecticut Tercentenary Commission offers America's making in Connecticut: A pageant of the races), and The Pageant of Hingham, a work celebrating the three-hundredth anniversary of Hingham, Massachusetts (Library of Congress Catalog).

A pageant that perhaps received the most widespread attention in the national media was his Glory of the Light: The Drama of Missions, a production sponsored by the Episcopal Church, which utilized the talents of 1,300 actors, was produced in Philadelphia in 1937, and received coverage in Time magazine. Following its initial production in Philadelphia, it was produced in Cincinnati as part of the triennial Episcopal General Convention. The Cincinnati cast included Charles Phelps Taft II, son of former U.S. President William Howard Taft.

Towards the close of World War II, he produced Watchers of the World, which was described as "a dramatic ritual in honor of the living who serve and in tribute to the fallen in the cause of the United nations, a ceremonial for dedication of service flag, honor roll and for [M]emorial [D]ay" in 1944([Library of Congress Catalog]). This was followed in 1945 with For Freedom’s Sake!, "a pageant of the people in three actions: In celebration of victory; In gratitude for peace; In consecration to freedom" (Library of Congress catalog).

== Later involvement in Sinfonia ==
The extent of Burrell's involvement in Sinfonia between after the conclusion of his term as Supreme President in 1914 and 1948 is not clear, though periodically there appeared references to him in the annual publications. Both he and 1922–1928 Supreme President Peter Dykema were associated with the organization Community Service so it is possible that their paths crossed in that context.

To help commemorate Phi Mu Alpha Sinfonia's 50th anniversary in 1948, Burrell authored Sinfonia Birthday, which was described as "An Historical Play based upon facts of the founding of Phi Mu Alpha Fraternity." Although the work had a somewhat humorous tone, and although it is possible that the author took dramatic licence with this work, the play has been used to help form an understanding of the fraternity's earliest years by fraternity historians, and was a source for the fraternity's Centennial History, authored by Dr. T. Jervis Underwood.

A photograph in a Phi Mu Alpha Sinfonia magazine showed Burrell at the 1948 national fraternity convention assisting in the presentation of a commemorative gavel made of wood taken from the USS Constitution. The gavel continues to be used today during the Fraternity's triennial national conventions and is stored at the fraternity's national headquarters, Lyrecrest, in Evansville, Indiana, when not in use. He also spoke at the 1952 national convention in Cincinnati, Ohio, which is believed to be his last visit to a national fraternity event. A photograph in the fraternity's archives taken at the convention - possibly the last known picture of Burrell at a national fraternity event - shows him presenting a photograph of the first National Convention held in Boston, Massachusetts, in 1901. While the archives contain no official explanation of his intentions in presenting the picture, some believe that he did so as a reminder of the fraternity's early days, of which he was an integral part. The photograph is on display at Lyrecrest.

== Death and posthumous honors ==
Burrell died at the age of 87 in 1964, and was buried in what would for many years be an unmarked grave in Watertown, Massachusetts, on the outskirts of Boston.

Throughout most of the twentieth century, his role in the early development of the philosophies of Phi Mu Alpha Sinfonia Fraternity was largely sidelined in fraternity publications and in the fraternity's ongoing philosophical dialogue. However, as the centennial of the fraternity approached in 1998, there was a revival of interest in the fraternity's original philosophies and values, much of which originated with Burrell as evidenced by his writings. After locating his grave in 1999, a fund-raising effort was undertaken by the fraternity's national historian to provide a monument for Burrell's burial site. The monument was dedicated by national fraternity leaders in a graveside ceremony on the morning of Saturday, October 2, 2004, as part of the fraternity's annual Founders Day observance. On the stone is inscribed the phrase used to describe Burrell: "Master Pageant Master."

Burrell has also been memorialized through the Burrell Award for Province Interaction, presented to fraternity chapters in the state of Virginia.

In addition, The Percy is a traveling wooden trophy which one fraternity chapter retrieves from another chapter from time to time. The trophy is named in honor of Burrell because of his influence in the early expansion of the fraternity. It was established in February 1996 by Curtis Shirley, one of the pioneers of the Fraternity's CPR Council and the fraternity's Province 28 (made up of chapters in northern and central Indiana). Since then, it has traveled to dozens of campuses throughout the nation.

== Quotes ==
"He has not truly lived who has not lived for others, in sympathy and in harmony with his fellows."

"It is a truism that as long as man loves but himself and his art he can never attain to the full measure of manhood or reach the sublimest heights of his art. He must seek to love men as brothers and art, not for the sake of art itself, but art as a means toward bringing all men up to that verdant plateau where their souls may be fed in very rejoicing in all that is true, beautiful, and abiding." (April 1, 1908)

"Let us tune ourselves up to the highest key of brotherhood and so make a veritable Symphony Orchestra of the minds and hearts of America’s musicians and her lovers of music, and then shall we drown the old world’s sharps and flats.” (1909)

== Productions and/or works published ==
- A guide to "The evergreen tree"; a masque of Christmas time (1917) New York City
- Hope Valley (1910) Boston, MA
- Four epochs of world conquest
- The Pioneer Pageant: How the West Was Won (1924)
- Pageant of liberty, commemorating Lancaster, Pennsylvania, in the American revolution (1926) Lancaster, PA
- The Pageant of Colorado (1927)
- The Pageant of Saratoga (1927)
- The York Pageant: How the American Federation Was Founded (1927) York, PA
- The pageant of Wyoming Valley. A drama of patriotism and industry (1928), Wilkes-Barre, PA
- Pageant of gratitude, for two hundred years of blessing upon Lancaster County (1929), Lancaster, PA
- The Pageant of New Brunswick (1930)
- Pageant of time; an adventure of education in the realm of leisure (1930)
- The Soul of Maryland: Pageant of the Founding (1934)
- America's Making in Connecticut (1935)
- The pageant of Hingham; in celebration of the 300th anniversary of the settlement and incorporation of the town of Hingham, Massachusetts (1935)
- Glory of the light; the drama of missions (1937)
- Watchers of the world, a dramatic ritual in honor of the living who serve and in tribute to the fallen in the cause of the United nations, a ceremonial for dedication of service flag, honor roll and for memorial day (1943,1944)
- For freedom's sake! A pageant of the people in three actions: In celebration of victory; In gratitude for peace; In consecration to freedom (1945)
- Sinfonia Birthday (December 1948) (Chicago, IL - Phi Mu Alpha Sinfonia Fraternity National Convention)

== See also ==
- List of Boston University people
- List of Sinfonians

Preceded by W. S. Sterling	Supreme President of Phi Mu Alpha Sinfonia; 1907–1914	Succeeded by Gilbert Raynolds Combs
