= List of Phi Mu Alpha Sinfonia chapters =

Phi Mu Alpha Sinfonia (ΦΜΑ) is an American collegiate social fraternity for men with a special interest in music. The chapter is the basic unit of organization in Phi Mu Alpha. The designation of chapter has been given to at least three different kinds of organization over the history of the fraternity: collegiate, alumni and professional. The only form currently in use, the collegiate chapter, is defined as an organization at a college, university or school of music that has been granted a charter by the fraternity. There are currently 251 active collegiate chapters in the United States, and more than 550 chapters have been chartered in total over the history of the organization.

Alumni chapters existed between 1966 and 1976, after which they were designated as professional chapters by the 1976 National Assembly at the University of Evansville. Professional chapters, notable for being able to initiate brothers, lasted from the creation of an experimental chapter in Washington, D.C. in 1974 until the final two professional chapters dissolved in the 1985-1988 triennium. During the 1997 National Assembly in Cincinnati, Ohio, the fraternity returned to the idea of an organizational space for alumni engagement by establishing alumni associations.

== Formation and closure ==
Chapters are formed by the granting of charters to petitioning groups at qualified institutions of higher education. The only basic qualification for an institution to house a chapter of Phi Mu Alpha Sinfonia is that it offers a four-year degree in music. Before receiving a charter, petitioning groups must seek recognition as a colony, which is the designation given to a developing chapter. After being recognized as a colony, the petitioning group must complete the fraternity's Colony Program, which consists of numerous activities designed to help the group organize itself as an effective and viable branch of the fraternity. After completing all aspects of the fraternity's Colony Program, a colony may be approved by the Commission on Standards to receive a chapter charter.

Chapter charters may be recalled by the Commission on Standards for operational or disciplinary reasons, either placing the chapter on inactive status or by expelling the chapter by revoking its charter respectively. Inactive chapters may be reactivated through the Colony Program, but groups at institutions that formerly housed chapters of Sinfonia that were expelled or had their charter revoked must wait no less than seven years before recolonizing.

== Oldest chapters ==
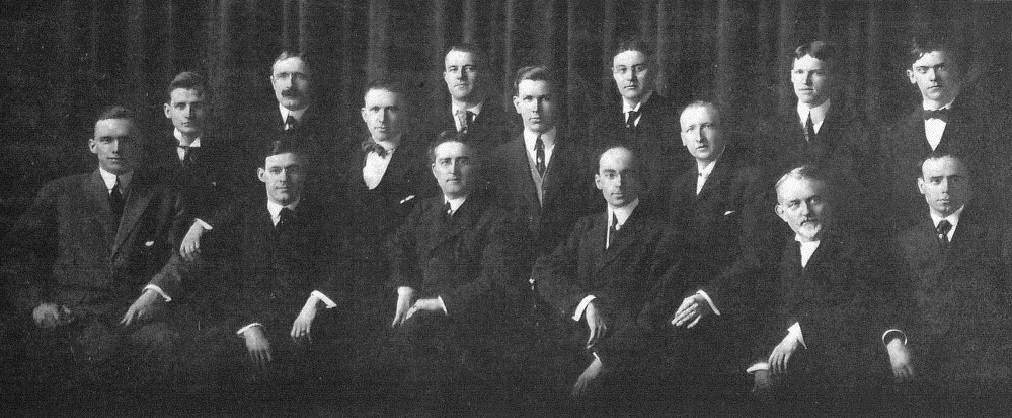
The Zeta chapter at the University of Missouri School of Music in 1908

The Alpha chapter, founded in 1898 at the New England Conservatory of Music as the Sinfonia Club, was active until 1977. It experienced a brief revival from 1991 to 1995, but closed once more and has remained inactive. The Delta chapter at Ithaca College in Ithaca, New York was chartered on January 28, 1901, and remained continuously active for 123 years until being suspended in 2024.

Six chapters have passed the 100-year milestone: the Zeta chapter at the University of Missouri (chartered 1907), the Iota chapter at Northwestern University (chartered 1910), the Mu chapter at the University of Oklahoma (chartered 1912), the Alpha Theta chapter at Miami University (chartered 1923) the Alpha Zeta chapter at Penn State University(chartered 1923). And the Alpha Lamda chapter at Illinois Wesleyan University (charted 1924).

== Naming conventions ==
Like those of many other Greek-letter fraternities, chapters of Phi Mu Alpha have names consisting of either one or two Greek letters. The names are issued in alphabetical order according to the dates on which the chapters are chartered. For instance, Alpha is the name given to the founding chapter, followed by Beta for the second chapter, then Gamma, and so on. Once the Greek alphabet had been exhausted by using single letters, two-letter names began to be issued, starting with Alpha Beta, then Alpha Gamma, then Alpha Delta, etc.

Names using the same two Greek letters, such as Alpha Alpha, Beta Beta, Gamma Gamma, etc., were not used. Also, in the first cycle of chapter naming, letters that came before the first letter of a chapter's name in the Greek alphabet were not used for the second letter. Thus, after Alpha Omega the next name issued was Beta Gamma, not Beta Alpha. Likewise, after Beta Omega, the next name issued was Gamma Delta; Gamma Alpha, and Gamma Beta were not used. Using this system, 300 names could be generated, but due to the fraternity's rapid expansion in the mid-20th century all of the possible names were exhausted in 1969. Beginning in that year (after the last name possible under the old system, Psi Omega, was issued), the fraternity began to issue unused two-letter names beginning with Beta Alpha. However, names with two identical Greek letters were still not used. Without using such repeated-letter names, there is a total of 576 possible one- and two-letter names, of which 444 have been issued to date. The only exception to the repeated-letter chapter name rule is Alpha Alpha. However, Alpha Alpha is not an actual collegiate chapter, but is instead the chapter designation used when initiating men as National Honorary members.

Colony names take one of two forms. If a chapter was previously chartered at an institution, then a colony that is later recognized at that institution is given the name of the chapter that was originally there. Upon the colony's successful completion of the colony program, the original chapter is reactivated and the original charter document (if it still exists) is reissued along with a separate Certificate of Reactivation. If there has never been a chapter at an institution, then a colony there is issued a name consisting of the state where the institution is located followed by a single Greek letter to distinguish it from any other colonies in the state (e.g., Texas Gamma, Ohio Beta, etc.). Upon the colony's successful completion of the colony program, a new chapter is installed and a charter with the next chapter name in sequence is issued.

=== Naming anomalies ===
The fraternity has not always held to a strictly alphabetical naming scheme. Gamma and Zeta were reissued in the early days of the fraternity, while Mu Epsilon was never issued and will likely never be based on how far it is out of sequence. The founding order of some chapters does not strictly align to their names due to a period of rapid expansion in the 1950s and 1960s, where up to ten chapters were chartered in a single week, as the Fraternity followed naming in the order paperwork was filed with the National Office.

Naming anomalies also have occurred at the chapter level. Following a merger of the College of Music of Cincinnati and the Cincinnati Conservatory of Music, their respective chapters Eta and Omicron combined to form Eta-Omicron; to date this is the only chapter that uses a hyphen in its name. Three institutions (Grambling State University, McNeese State University, and Texas Southern University) have each had two chapters with different names; the first chapter chartered at the institution was expelled and the later petitioning group requested that a new chapter be installed instead of the expelled chapter being reactivated.

== Chapters ==
The following table contains a comprehensive listing of all collegiate chapters in the order that they were chartered. Active chapters are indicated in bold. Inactive chapters and institutions are in italics.

Number	Chapter	Charter date and range	Institution	Location	Status	Ref.
101	Alpha	October 6, 1898 – 1977; 1991–1995	New England Conservatory of Music	Boston, Massachusetts	Inactive	
102	Beta	October 6, 1900 – 1930; 1960–1984	Combs College of Music	Philadelphia, Pennsylvania	Inactive	
103	Old Gamma	November 26, 1900 – 1911	American Institute of Applied Art	New York City, New York	Inactive	(Note: Gamma and Zeta were each assigned twice in the early days of the fraternity. The terms "Old" and "New" were used for differentiation purposes in fraternity publications of that era.)
105	Delta	January 28, 1901 – 2024	Ithaca College	Ithaca, New York	Inactive	
106	**Epsilon**	June 2, 1902 – 1967; 1991	University of Michigan	Ann Arbor, Michigan	Active	
107	Old Zeta	June 9, 1902 – 1904	Chicago Auditorium Conservatory	Chicago, Illinois	Inactive	
109	Eta	April 9, 1903 – 1955	College of Music of Cincinnati	Cincinnati, Ohio	Merged	(Note: Eta-Omicron was formed by the merger of Eta and Omicron when their sheltering institutions merged in 1955.)
104	New Gamma	April 27, 1904 – 1911	Detroit Conservatory of Music	Detroit, Michigan	Inactive	
110	**Theta**	May 4, 1904 – 1977; 2005	Syracuse University	Syracuse, New York	Active	
108	New Zeta	June 7, 1907 - 2025	University of Missouri	Columbia, Missouri	Active	
111	**Iota**	April 29, 1910	Northwestern University	Evanston, Illinois	Active	
112	Kappa	March 1, 1911 – 1915; 1958–1985	Peabody Institute	Baltimore, Maryland.	Inactive	
113	Lambda	March 3, 1911 – 1915; 1924–1971	DePauw University	Greencastle, Indiana	Inactive	
114	**Mu**	April 10, 1912	University of Oklahoma	Norman, Oklahoma	Active	
115	Nu	April 18, 1912 – 1949; 1958–1969	Denison University	Granville, Ohio	Inactive	
117	Omicron	January 24, 1914 – 1955	Cincinnati Conservatory of Music	Cincinnati, Ohio	Merged	
116	**Xi**	April 14, 1914 – 1988; 1997	University of Kansas	Lawrence, Kansas	Active	
118	Pi	March 2, 1917 – 2015	Simpson College	Indianola, Iowa	Inactive	
119	Rho	May 11, 1920 – 1983	American Conservatory of Music	Chicago, Illinois	Inactive	
120	Sigma	February 17, 1921 – 1974	University of Washington	Seattle, Washington	Inactive	
121	**Tau**	February 19, 1921 – 1934; 1960–1985; 1999	Kansas State University	Manhattan, Kansas	Active	
122	**Upsilon**	February 23, 1921 – 1989; 2008	University of Nebraska–Lincoln	Lincoln, Nebraska	Active	
123	Phi	March 5, 1921 – 1975; 2001-circa 2012	University of Wisconsin – Madison	Madison, Wisconsin	Inactive	
124	**Chi**	October 10, 1921 – 1974; 2019	Washington State University	Pullman, Washington	Active	
125	Psi	October 16, 1921 – 1974	University of Oregon	Eugene, Oregon	Inactive	
127	**Alpha Beta**	May 21, 1922	Drake University	Des Moines, Iowa	Active	
126	Omega	May 24, 1922 – 1982	Ohio Wesleyan University	Delaware, Ohio	Inactive	
128	**Alpha Gamma**	December 13, 1922 – 1977; 1979 – 1989; 1996	University of Kentucky	Lexington, Kentucky	Active	
129	**Alpha Delta**	December 17, 1922 – 2000; 2015	Iowa State University	Ames, Iowa	Active	
131	**Alpha Zeta**	February 3, 1923	Pennsylvania State University	State College, Pennsylvania	Active	
130	Alpha Epsilon	March 10, 1923 – 1973; 1981 – 1983	University of Southern California	Los Angeles, California	Inactive	
132	Alpha Eta	September 19, 1923 – 1932	Denver College of Music	Denver, Colorado	Inactive	
133	**Alpha Theta**	October 13, 1923	Miami University	Oxford, Ohio	Active	
135	Alpha Kappa	April 14, 1924 – 2018	Ohio University	Athens, Ohio	Inactive	
134	**Alpha Iota**	May 11, 1924	University of Texas at Austin	Austin, Texas	Active	
136	**Alpha Lambda**	June 7, 1924	Illinois Wesleyan University	Bloomington, Illinois	Active	
137	Alpha Mu	June 17, 1924 – 1974	University of Minnesota	Minneapolis and Saint Paul, Minnesota	Inactive	
138	Alpha Nu	January 24, 1925 – 2009	Eastman School of Music, University of Rochester	Rochester, New York	Inactive	(Note: This chapter was expelled)
140	**Alpha Omicron**	May 31, 1925 – 1933; 1949	University of Arkansas	Fayetteville, Arkansas	Active	
139	**Alpha Xi**	June 6, 1925	University of Illinois Urbana-Champaign	Urbana and Champaign, Illinois	Active	
141	Alpha Pi	June 6, 1925 – 1950	Bucknell University	Lewisburg, Pennsylvania	Inactive	
142	**Alpha Rho**	February 24, 1926 – 1972; 1976	University of North Carolina at Chapel Hill	Chapel Hill, North Carolina	Active	
143	**Alpha Sigma**	May 30, 1926 – 1986; 1996	Butler University	Indianapolis, Indiana	Active	
144	Alpha Tau	February 12, 1927 – 1992	Wittenberg University	Springfield, Ohio	Inactive	
147	**Alpha Chi**	February 21, 1927 – 1974; 1993	University of Tulsa	Tulsa, Oklahoma	Active	
145	**Alpha Upsilon**	March 29, 1927 – 1977; 1983 – 1987; 2013	University of Arizona	Tucson, Arizona	Active	
146	Alpha Phi	May 10, 1927 – 2007	Fort Hays State University	Hays, Kansas	Inactive	
148	Alpha Psi	November 18, 1927 – 1987	University of Missouri–Kansas City	Kansas City, Missouri	Inactive	
149	Alpha Omega	March 25, 1928 – 2002	Carnegie Mellon University	Pittsburgh, Pennsylvania	Inactive	
151	Beta Gamma	April 24, 1928 – 1976	Columbia University	New York City, New York	Inactive	
152	**Beta Delta**	October 9, 1928 – 1974; 2001	Pittsburg State University	Pittsburg, Kansas	Active	
153	Beta Epsilon	December 21, 1928 – 1980	New York University	New York City, New York	Inactive	
154	Beta Zeta	March 15, 1929 – 1941; 1954–1973	College of Emporia	Emporia, Kansas	Inactive	
155	Beta Eta	April 1, 1929 – 1976; 1980–1981	San José State University	San Jose, California	Inactive	
156	**Beta Theta**	October 17, 1929	Millikin University	Decatur, Illinois	Active	
157	**Beta Iota**	October 31, 1930 – 1970; 1977	Albion College	Albion, Michigan	Active	
158	Beta Kappa	November 1, 1930 - 2025	Coe College	Cedar Rapids, Iowa	Inactive	
159	**Beta Lambda**	November 3, 1930 – 1969; 1995	Muskingum University	New Concord, Ohio	Active	
160	**Beta Mu**	December 8, 1930	Central Methodist University	Fayette, Missouri	Active	
163	**Beta Omicron**	May 24, 1931	Mansfield University of Pennsylvania	Mansfield, Pennsylvania	Active	
161	**Beta Nu**	May 28, 1931	University of Northern Iowa	Cedar Falls, Iowa	Active	
162	**Beta Xi**	May 29, 1931 – 1975; 1986	Ohio State University	Columbus, Ohio	Active	
164	**Beta Pi**	December 14, 1931	University of the Pacific	Stockton, California	Active	
165	Beta Rho	June 5, 1934 – 1977	University of Northern Colorado	Greeley, Colorado	Inactive	
166	**Beta Sigma**	June 7, 1936 – 1975; 2003	University of Idaho	Moscow, Idaho	Active	
167	**Beta Tau**	March 5, 1937	University of Miami	Coral Gables, Florida	Active	
168	Beta Upsilon	April 23, 1937 – 1974	Emporia State University	Emporia, Kansas	Inactive	
170	Beta Chi	May 30, 1937 – 1976; 1980–1985	University of Colorado Boulder	Boulder, Colorado	Inactive	
171	Beta Psi	June 11, 1937 – 1973; 2012–2022	University of California, Los Angeles	Los Angeles, California	Inactive	
169	Beta Phi	June 12, 1937 – 1985	Baldwin Wallace University	Berea, Ohio	Inactive	
172	Beta Omega	January 28, 1938 – 2011	Louisiana State University	Baton Rouge, Louisiana	Inactive	
175	**Gamma Delta**	May 15, 1938	Murray State University	Murray, Kentucky	Active	
176	**Gamma Epsilon**	November 22, 1938	Michigan State University	East Lansing, Michigan	Active	
177	Gamma Zeta	November 27, 1938	Lawrence University	Appleton, Wisconsin	Inactive	
178	**Gamma Eta**	December 27, 1938 – 1940; 1953	Furman University	Greenville, South Carolina	Active	
180	**Gamma Iota**	May 18, 1940	Baylor University	Waco, Texas	Active	
179	**Gamma Theta**	May 19, 1940	University of North Texas	Denton, Texas	Active	
181	Gamma Kappa	November 10, 1940 – 1969	Davidson College	Davidson, North Carolina	Inactive	
183	Gamma Mu	November 16, 1940 – 1988	Bethany College	Lindsborg, Kansas	Inactive	
182	Gamma Lambda	November 22, 1940 – 1955	Hendrix College	Conway, Arkansas	Inactive	
184	Gamma Nu	December 29, 1940 – 1946	Case Western Reserve University	Cleveland, Ohio	Inactive	
185	**Gamma Xi**	June 4, 1941	Morningside University	Sioux City, Iowa	Active	
186	Gamma Omicron	June 9, 1941 – 1978; 1981–1997	Wayne State University	Detroit, Michigan	Inactive	
187	**Gamma Pi**	January 24, 1942 – 1983; 2008	California State University, Fresno	Fresno, California	Active	
188	**Gamma Rho**	May 24, 1942	Northwestern State University	Natchitoches, Louisiana	Active	
189	Gamma Sigma	February 28, 1947 – 1979; 1982–1985	Wichita State University	Wichita, Kansas	Inactive	
190	Gamma Tau	April 11, 1947 – 1973; 1990–2002	Indiana University Bloomington	Bloomington, Indiana	Inactive	
191	Gamma Upsilon	April 12, 1947 – 1986	Phillips University	Enid, Oklahoma	Inactive	
193	Gamma Chi	May 15, 1947 – 1987	Texas Wesleyan University	Fort Worth, Texas	Inactive	
192	**Gamma Phi**	May 20, 1947 – 1977; 1978	Texas State University	San Marcos, Texas	Active	
194	Gamma Psi	May 22, 1947 – 1981	Peabody College	Nashville, Tennessee	Inactive	
195	**Gamma Omega**	October 5, 1947	Indiana State University	Terre Haute, Indiana	Active	
199	**Delta Epsilon**	December 2, 1947	University of Louisiana at Lafayette	Lafayette, Louisiana	Active	
200	**Delta Zeta**	January 17, 1948 – 1979; 1995 – 2000; 2010	Oklahoma City University	Oklahoma City, Oklahoma	Active	
201	Delta Eta	February 7, 1948 – 1987; 2002 - 2022	Youngstown State University	Youngstown, Ohio	Inactive	
204	Delta Kappa	March 13, 1948 – 1986	University of South Dakota	Vermillion, South Dakota	Inactive	
203	**Delta Iota**	April 17, 1948	Western Michigan University	Kalamazoo, Michigan	Active	
202	Delta Theta	May 1, 1948 – 1981	University of Montana	Missoula, Montana	Inactive	
206	Delta Mu	May 21, 1948 – 2022	Texas Christian University	Fort Worth, Texas	Inactive	
205	**Delta Lambda**	May 23, 1948	Ball State University	Muncie, Indiana	Active	
207	**Delta Nu**	June 10, 1948	Bradley University	Peoria, Illinois	Active	
208	Delta Xi	June 24, 1948 – 1988	Eastern Michigan University	Ypsilanti, Michigan	Inactive	
209	Delta Omicron	October 6, 1948 – 1975	Boston University	Boston, Massachusetts	Inactive	
211	Delta Rho	December 28, 1948 – 1975	University of Wisconsin–Milwaukee	Milwaukee, Wisconsin	Inactive	
210	**Delta Pi**	January 15, 1949	University of Redlands	Redlands, California	Active	
213	**Delta Tau**	February 11, 1949 – 1981; 1989	Oklahoma State University–Stillwater	Stillwater, Oklahoma	Active	
212	**Delta Sigma**	February 12, 1949	University of South Carolina	Columbia, South Carolina	Active	
215	Delta Phi	February 18, 1949 – 1973	Lewis & Clark College	Portland, Oregon	Inactive	
214	Delta Upsilon	March 12, 1949; 1984–1986	Southern Methodist University	Dallas, Texas	Inactive	
216	Delta Chi	April 4, 1949 – 1959	Minneapolis College of Music	Minneapolis, Minnesota	Inactive	
218	**Delta Omega**	May 21, 1949	Southeastern Louisiana University	Hammond, Louisiana	Active	
223	Epsilon Zeta	May 28, 1949 – 1977; 1981 – 1985	University of Denver	Denver, Colorado	Inactive	
217	**Delta Psi**	June 1, 1949	Auburn University	Auburn, Alabama	Active	
224	Epsilon Eta	June 4, 1949 – 1969; 1989 – 2011	University of Puget Sound	Tacoma, Washington	Inactive	
225	Epsilon Theta	June 5, 1949 – 1973	Roosevelt University	Chicago, Illinois	Inactive	
226	**Epsilon Iota**	November 8, 1949	Florida State University	Tallahassee, Florida	Active	
227	**Epsilon Kappa**	November 19, 1949	Southern Illinois University Carbondale	Carbondale, Illinois	Active	
228	**Epsilon Lambda**	January 14, 1950	University of Georgia	Athens, Georgia	Active	
229	Epsilon Mu	February 12, 1950 – 1959	Kansas City Conservatory of Music	Kansas City, Missouri	Inactive	(Note: The chapter closed when the school merged with the University of Missouri–Kansas City.)
230	**Epsilon Nu**	May 7, 1950	Jacksonville State University	Jacksonville, Alabama	Active	
231	Epsilon Xi	May 20, 1950 – 1958	Idaho State University	Pocatello, Idaho	Inactive	
232	**Epsilon Omicron**	May 27, 1950	San Diego State University	San Diego, California	Active	
233	**Epsilon Pi**	May 28, 1950 – 1986; 1989–2006; 2014	Hartwick College	Oneonta, New York	Active	
234	**Epsilon Rho**	May 30, 1950 – 1983; 1994	Northern Illinois University	DeKalb, Illinois	Active	
235	**Epsilon Sigma**	June 4, 1950 – 1985; 1999	West Virginia University	Morgantown, West Virginia	Active	
236	Epsilon Tau	December 3, 1950 – 1974	Eastern Washington University	Cheney, Washington	Inactive	
237	**Epsilon Upsilon**	January 19, 1951	University of Evansville	Evansville, Indiana	Active	
238	**Epsilon Phi**	April 29, 1951	Capital University	Bexley, Ohio	Active	
240	Epsilon Psi	April 29, 1951 – 1970	University of Wyoming	Laramie, Wyoming	Inactive	
239	Epsilon Chi	May 13, 1951 – 1970	Pepperdine University	Los Angeles County, California	Inactive	
241	Epsilon Omega	May 20, 1951 – 1987	University of Nebraska Omaha	Omaha, Nebraska	Inactive	
247	Zeta Eta	January 27, 1952 – 1978; 2006-2020	Marshall University	Huntington, West Virginia	Inactive	
250	**Zeta Kappa**	May 13, 1952 – 1976; 1982–1985; 1995	University of Louisville	Louisville, Kentucky	Active	
248	Zeta Theta	May 14, 1952 – 1989	Wagner College	Staten Island, New York	Inactive	
249	**Zeta Iota**	May 19, 1952 – 1973; 1977	Howard University	Washington, D.C.	Active	
251	Zeta Lambda	January 24, 1953 – 1973	Brigham Young University	Provo, Utah	Inactive	
253	Zeta Nu	March 21, 1953 – 1967	Washington University	St. Louis County, Missouri	Inactive	
254	Zeta Xi	May 3, 1953 – 1977; 2001–2004	Lincoln University	Jefferson City, Missouri	Inactive	
255	**Zeta Omicron**	May 15, 1953	Georgia Southern University	Statesboro, Georgia	Active	
259	**Zeta Tau**	May 21, 1953	Indiana University of Pennsylvania	Indiana, Pennsylvania	Active	
258	**Zeta Sigma**	May 22, 1953	Texas Tech University	Lubbock, Texas	Active	
257	Zeta Rho	May 23, 1953 – 1979; 1984–1987; 2005–2018	Fisk University	Nashville, Tennessee	Inactive	
256	Zeta Pi	May 24, 1953 – 1967	Loyola University New Orleans	New Orleans, Louisiana	Inactive	
260	Zeta Upsilon	May 2, 1954 – 1978; 1988–1993	California State University, Los Angeles	Los Angeles, California	Inactive	
261	Zeta Phi	May 29, 1954 – 1983	Friends University	Wichita, Kansas	Inactive	
252	**Zeta Mu**	December 4, 1954 – 1990; 2000	Sam Houston State University	Huntsville, Texas	Active	
263	**Zeta Psi**	February 19, 1955	East Carolina University	Greenville, North Carolina	Active	
262	Zeta Chi	March 20, 1955 – 1997	McNeese State University	Lake Charles, Louisiana	Inactive	(Note: Colonies at Grambling State University, McNeese State University, and Texas Southern University petitioned for and received new chapter designations to distance themselves from the events that lead to the expulsions of the original chapters at those institutions.)
271	Eta Theta	May 14, 1955 – 1973	Catholic University of America	Washington, D.C.	Inactive	
264	**Zeta Omega**	May 23, 1955 – 1976; 1992 – 1996; 2002	University of Hartford	West Hartford, Connecticut	Active	
278	**Eta-Omicron**	November 2, 1955 – 2002; 2005	University of Cincinnati	Cincinnati, Ohio	Active	
273	Eta Kappa	December 11, 1955 – 1975	Occidental College	Los Angeles, California	Inactive	
272	**Eta Iota**	December 15, 1955 – 1995; 2012	University of Louisiana at Monroe	Monroe, Louisiana	Active	
276	**Eta Nu**	May 14, 1956	Saint Mary's University of Minnesota	Winona, Minnesota	Active	
274	Eta Lambda	May 20, 1956 – 1976	Minnesota State University Moorhead	Moorhead, Minnesota	Inactive	
275	**Eta Mu**	May 20, 1956	Lamar University	Beaumont, Texas	Active	
277	**Eta Xi**	May 20, 1956 – 1991; 2000	Tennessee State University	Nashville, Tennessee	Active	
279	Eta Pi	May 20, 1956 – 1976	Willamette University	Salem, Oregon	Inactive	
280	Eta Rho	April 14, 1957 – 1974	Park University	Parkville, Missouri	Inactive	
284	**Eta Phi**	May 15, 1957 – 2008; 2012	University of Southern Mississippi	Hattiesburg, Mississippi	Active	
281	Eta Sigma	May 17, 1957 – 1972; 1975–1981	San Francisco State University	San Francisco, California	Inactive	
282	Eta Tau	May 17, 1957 – 1974; 1980–1987	California State University-Sacramento	Sacramento, California	Inactive	
283	Eta Upsilon	May 18, 1957 – 1969; 1980–1989	Centenary College of Louisiana	Shreveport, Louisiana	Inactive	
285	Eta Chi	February 18, 1958 – 1975	University of Minnesota Duluth	Duluth, Minnesota	Inactive	
286	**Eta Psi**	February 28, 1958 – 1976; 2015	University of Maryland, College Park	College Park, Maryland	Active	
287	Eta Omega	April 26, 1958 – 2017	University of Florida	Gainesville, Florida	Inactive	
295	**Theta Iota**	December 6, 1958	State University of New York at Potsdam	Potsdam, New York	Active	
296	**Theta Kappa**	March 20, 1959 – 1985; 2003–2008; 2017	Mississippi College	Clinton, Mississippi	Active	
297	**Theta Lambda**	April 24, 1959	Hardin–Simmons University	Abilene, Texas	Active	
298	Theta Mu	April 24, 1959 – 1981	Midwestern State University	Wichita Falls, Texas	Inactive	
299	**Theta Nu**	May 3, 1959 – 1991; 1999	Northern State University	Aberdeen, South Dakota	Active	
300	Theta Xi	May 9, 1959 – 1987	Drury College	Springfield, Missouri	Inactive	
301	**Theta Omicron**	May 16, 1959 – 1976; 1978–1979; 1981	University of Tennessee	Knoxville, Tennessee	Active	
303	**Theta Rho**	May 20, 1959 – 2001; 2010	University of Memphis	Memphis, Tennessee	Active	
304	**Theta Sigma**	May 23, 1959 – 1969; 1972	Florida Southern College	Lakeland, Florida	Active	
305	**Theta Tau**	May 23, 1959	Austin Peay State University	Clarksville, Tennessee	Active	
302	**Theta Pi**	May 24, 1959	Morehead State University	Morehead, Kentucky	Active	
310	Theta Omega	April 3, 1960 – 1967	MacPhail Center for Music	Minneapolis, Minnesota	Inactive	
316	Iota Lambda	May 8, 1960 – 1991	Duquesne University	Pittsburgh, Pennsylvania	Inactive	
318	**Iota Nu**	May 12, 1960	Troy University	Troy, Alabama	Active	
307	**Theta Phi**	May 14, 1960 – 1986; 2011	Eastern New Mexico University	Portales, New Mexico	Active	
320	**Iota Omicron**	May 14, 1960	Bowling Green State University	Bowling Green, Ohio	Active	
321	**Iota Pi**	May 14, 1960	West Texas A&M University	Canyon, Texas	Active	
308	Theta Chi	May 15, 1960 – 1971	Dickinson College	Carlisle, Pennsylvania	Inactive	
315	**Iota Kappa**	May 15, 1960	Lebanon Valley College	Annville, Pennsylvania	Active	
319	Iota Xi	May 15, 1960 – 1986	University of Nebraska at Kearney	Kearney, Nebraska	Inactive	
309	Theta Psi	May 16, 1960 – 1980; 1984–1994	Georgetown College	Georgetown, Kentucky	Inactive	
322	**Iota Rho**	May 16, 1960 – 1976; 1981	Missouri State University	Springfield, Missouri	Active	
323	Iota Sigma	May 16, 1960 – 2011	Union University	Jackson, Tennessee	Inactive	
317	**Iota Mu**	May 20, 1960	Western Kentucky University	Bowling Green, Kentucky	Active	
306	**Theta Upsilon**	May 23, 1960	Delta State University	Cleveland, Mississippi	Active	
324	**Iota Tau**	November 5, 1960 –2002; 2012	Old Dominion University	Norfolk, Virginia	Active	
325	Iota Upsilon	January 10, 1961 – 2000	Wayland Baptist University	Plainview, Texas	Inactive	
326	**Iota Phi**	January 28, 1961 – 1974; 2013	University of New Mexico	Albuquerque, New Mexico	Active	
327	Iota Chi	February 20, 1961 – 1986	Evangel College	Springfield, Missouri	Inactive	
328	**Iota Psi**	March 4, 1961	Southeast Missouri State University	Cape Girardeau, Missouri	Active	
330	Kappa Lambda	March 12, 1961 – 1976	California State University-Northridge	Los Angeles, California	Inactive	
334	Kappa Omicron	March 12, 1961 – 1996; 2006–2022	California State University-Long Beach	Long Beach, California	Inactive	
329	Iota Omega	March 24, 1961 – 1982	Hope College	Holland, Michigan	Inactive	
331	Kappa Mu	April 4, 1961 – 1998	William Jewell College	Liberty, Missouri	Inactive	
332	**Kappa Nu**	April 16, 1961 – 1980; 1984 – 1993; 2018	Arizona State University	Tempe, Arizona	Colony	
333	**Kappa Xi**	April 16, 1961 – 1985; 1989 – 1998; 2008	Northern Arizona University	Flagstaff, Arizona	Active	
335	Kappa Pi	April 22, 1961 – 1982	Manhattan College	Bronx, New York City, New York	Inactive	
336	**Kappa Rho**	April 22, 1961 – 1992; 2015	Washburn University	Topeka, Kansas	Active	
337	**Kappa Sigma**	April 23, 1961	Valparaiso University	Valparaiso, Indiana	Active	
338	Kappa Tau	May 12, 1961 – 1984	University of Central Oklahoma	Edmond, Oklahoma	Inactive	
339	Kappa Upsilon	October 20, 1961 – 1971	Juilliard School	New York City, New York	Inactive	
340	Kappa Phi	January 26, 1962 – 1983	DePaul University	Chicago, Illinois	Inactive	
342	**Kappa Psi**	February 3, 1962	Western Illinois University	Macomb, Illinois	Active	
341	**Kappa Chi**	March 4, 1962	Del Mar College	Corpus Christi, Texas	Active	
343	Kappa Omega	March 10, 1962 – 1968	New York College of Music	Manhattan, New York City, New York	Inactive	(Note: Chapter closed when the college closed.)
344	Lambda Mu	March 31, 1962 - 2021	Montclair State University	Montclair, New Jersey	Inactive	
345	**Lambda Nu**	March 31, 1962 – 1980; 2016	The College of New Jersey	Ewing Township, New Jersey	Active	
346	**Lambda Xi**	March 31, 1962 – 1982; 1985–2000; 2002	University of Mississippi	Oxford, Mississippi	Active	
347	Lambda Omicron	March 8, 1963 – 1982; 1991–1999	University of West Alabama	Livingston, Alabama	Inactive	
349	Lambda Rho	March 8, 1963 – 1989; 1999–2012	Northwest Mississippi Community College	Senatobia, Mississippi	Inactive	
348	Lambda Pi	March 23, 1963 – 1997; 2002 - 2021	Boston Conservatory	Boston, Massachusetts	Inactive	
352	Lambda Upsilon	March 31, 1963 – 1973; 1978–1986	Kentucky Wesleyan College	Owensboro, Kentucky	Inactive	
351	Lambda Tau	1963–1973; 1978–1979	Minnesota State University, Mankato	Mankato, Minnesota	Inactive	
350	**Lambda Sigma**	April 28, 1963 – 1976; 1979	East Tennessee State University	Johnson City, Tennessee	Active	
356	Lambda Omega	April 28, 1963 – 1993	Carson-Newman College	Jefferson City, Tennessee	Inactive	
354	Lambda Chi	May 1, 1963 – 2000	Minot State University	Minot, North Dakota	Inactive	
355	Lambda Psi	May 4, 1963 – 1996	Mercer University	Macon, Georgia	Inactive	
353	**Lambda Phi**	May 16, 1963	Mississippi State University	Starkville, Mississippi	Active	
359	Mu Omicron	February 15, 1964 – 2013	Ouachita Baptist University	Arkadelphia, Arkansas	Inactive	
357	**Mu Nu**	April 4, 1964	Louisiana Tech University	Ruston, Louisiana	Active	
358	**Mu Xi**	April 18, 1964	Stephen F. Austin State University	Nacogdoches, Texas	Active	
360	Mu Pi	April 19, 1964 – 1975	Lewis University	Romeoville, Illinois	Inactive	
361	Mu Rho	May 23, 1964 – 1972; 1995–1999	New Mexico State University	Las Cruces, New Mexico	Inactive	
363	Mu Tau	February 14, 1965 – 1973	University of the Arts	Philadelphia, Pennsylvania	Inactive	
362	Mu Sigma	February 21, 1965 – 1979	Southwestern College	Winfield, Kansas	Inactive	
364	Mu Upsilon	February 22, 1965 – 1986	Belhaven College	Jackson, Mississippi.	Inactive	
365	Mu Phi	March 7, 1965 – 1983	Union Commonwealth University	Barbourville, Kentucky	Inactive	
368	Mu Omega	April 10, 1965 – 1989	Buena Vista College	Storm Lake, Iowa	Inactive	
366	Mu Chi	April 25, 1965 – 1982	Pacific University	Forest Grove, Oregon	Inactive	
373	**Nu Sigma**	April 25, 1965 – 1982; 1986	College of William & Mary	Williamsburg, Virginia	Active	
369	**Nu Xi**	April 30, 1965 – 1986; 1995–1998; 2025	William Carey University	Hattiesburg, Mississippi	Active	
370	**Nu Omicron**	May 1, 1965 – 1984; 1994	Illinois State University	Normal, Illinois	Active	
371	**Nu Pi**	May 9, 1965	Central Michigan University	Mount Pleasant, Michigan	Active	
375	Nu Upsilon	May 9, 1965 – 1976; 1987	Hillsdale College	Hillsdale, Michigan	Inactive	
367	**Mu Psi**	May 15, 1965	Southern University and A&M College	Baton Rouge, Louisiana	Active	
376	Nu Phi	May 22, 1965 – 1970	Orlando Junior College	Orlando, Florida	Inactive	(Note: Chapter closed when the college became Lake Highland Prep in 1970.)
372	Nu Rho	May 23, 1965 – 1982	Colorado State University Pueblo	Pueblo, Colorado	Inactive	
378	**Nu Psi**	November 21, 1965 – 1996; 2000	Shenandoah University	Winchester, Virginia	Active	
377	Nu Chi	November 29, 1965 – 1985	University of Mount Union	Alliance, Ohio	Inactive	
379	Nu Omega	December 3, 1965 – 1992	Howard Payne University	Brownwood, Texas	Inactive	
381	Xi Pi	December 10, 1965 – 2015	University of Wisconsin–Whitewater	Whitewater, Wisconsin	Inactive	
380	**Xi Omicron**	December 11, 1965	University of Wisconsin–Stevens Point	Stevens Point, Wisconsin	Active	
382	Xi Rho	February 5, 1966 – 1977; 1980–1987	Maryville College	Maryville, Tennessee	Inactive	
384	**Xi Tau**	March 6, 1966 – 1976; 1984–1993; 2001	Southern Illinois University Edwardsville	Edwardsville, Illinois	Active	
389	Xi Omega	April 1, 1966 - 2023	Frostburg State University	Frostburg, Maryland	Inactive	
383	**Xi Sigma**	April 2, 1966 – 1975; 2013	Bethel University	McKenzie, Tennessee	Active	
374	Nu Tau	April 17, 1966 – 1977	University of Wisconsin–Oshkosh	Oshkosh, Wisconsin	Inactive	
385	**Xi Upsilon**	April 17, 1966	Eastern Illinois University	Charleston, Illinois	Active	
388	Xi Psi	April 24, 1966 – 1990	Westminster College	New Wilmington, Pennsylvania	Inactive	
387	Xi Chi	April 30, 1966 – 2004	Tennessee Tech	Cookeville, Tennessee	Inactive	
392	Omicron Sigma	April 30, 1966 – 1974	Portland State University	Portland, Oregon	Inactive	
390	**Omicron Pi**	May 1, 1966	California State University, Fullerton	Fullerton, California	Active	
391	**Omicron Rho**	May 7, 1966 – 1984; 1985	Belmont University	Nashville, Tennessee	Active	
386	Xi Phi	May 14, 1966 – 1974	Iowa Wesleyan College	Mount Pleasant	Inactive	
393	**Omicron Tau**	May 21, 1966	Middle Tennessee State University	Murfreesboro, Tennessee	Active	
394	**Omicron Upsilon**	May 29, 1966	University of Houston	Houston, Texas	Active	
395	**Omicron Phi**	October 20, 1966	University of Alabama	Tuscaloosa, Alabama	Active	
396	Omicron Chi	December 4, 1966 – 1990	Jacksonville University	Jacksonville, Florida	Inactive	
399	**Pi Rho**	January 7, 1967 – 1992; 1997	Mars Hill University	Mars Hill, North Carolina	Active	
397	**Omicron Psi**	February 12, 1967	Eastern Kentucky University	Richmond, Kentucky	Active	
398	**Omicron Omega**	April 1, 1967	Arkansas State University	Jonesboro, Arkansas	Active	
403	Pi Phi	April 11, 1967 – 1974	California State University, Hayward	Hayward, California	Inactive	
407	**Rho Sigma**	April 27, 1967	West Chester University	West Chester, Pennsylvania	Active	
402	**Pi Upsilon**	April 30, 1967 - December 9, 2024	Colorado State University	Fort Collins, Colorado	Inactive	
401	Pi Tau	May 2, 1967 – 2009	Oklahoma Baptist University	Shawnee, Oklahoma	Inactive	
404	**Pi Chi**	May 7, 1967 – 1988; 2004	Texas A&M University–Kingsville	Kingsville, Texas	Active	
405	**Pi Psi**	May 7, 1967	Texas A&M University–Commerce	Commerce, Texas	Active	
406	Pi Omega	May 7, 1967 – 1989	Gettysburg College	Gettysburg, Pennsylvania	Inactive	
408	**Rho Tau**	May 7, 1967	Appalachian State University	Boone, North Carolina	Active	
409	**Rho Upsilon**	May 8, 1967 – 1980; 2000	Temple University	Philadelphia, Pennsylvania	Active	
412	Rho Psi	May 17, 1967 – 1977	Wake Forest University	Winston-Salem, North Carolina	Inactive	
413	**Rho Omega**	May 17, 1967 – 1971; 1977–1991; 2012	Virginia Commonwealth University	Richmond, Virginia	Active	
410	Rho Phi	May 21, 1967 – 1970	Kent State University	Kent, Ohio	Inactive	
411	Rho Chi	May 27, 1967 – 2021	State University of New York at Fredonia	Fredonia, New York	Inactive	
414	**Sigma Tau**	November 5, 1967 – 1976; April 2, 2017	Towson University	Towson, Maryland	Active	
415	Sigma Upsilon	November 14, 1967 – 1983; 1994–1999	Adrian College	Adrian, Michigan	Inactive	
400	Pi Sigma	December 1, 1967 – 2015	Samford University	Homewood, Alabama	Inactive	
417	**Sigma Chi**	February 24, 1968	Henderson State University	Arkadelphia, Arkansas	Active	
416	Sigma Phi	March 23, 1968 – 1996	Brevard Community College	Brevard County, Florida	Inactive	
418	**Sigma Psi**	May 4, 1968	University of Tennessee at Martin	Martin, Tennessee	Active	
419	**Sigma Omega**	May 11, 1968 – 1984; 1986–2004; 2010	University of Texas at Arlington	Arlington, Texas	Active	
421	**Tau Phi**	May 16, 1968	Southwestern Oklahoma State University	Weatherford, Oklahoma	Active	
420	Tau Upsilon	May 26, 1968 – 1979	University of Findlay	Findlay, Ohio	Inactive	
424	Tau Omega	May 26, 1968 – 1990	Northern Michigan University	Marquette, Michigan	Inactive	
422	Tau Chi	October 18, 1968 – 1978	University of Arkansas at Little Rock	Little Rock, Arkansas	Inactive	
427	**Upsilon Psi**	October 26, 1968	University of South Florida	Tampa, Florida	Active	
423	Tau Psi	November 10, 1968 – 1976	St. Cloud State University	St. Cloud, Minnesota	Inactive	
428	Upsilon Omega	November 10, 1968 – 1975	University of North Dakota	Grand Forks, North Dakota	Inactive	
425	**Upsilon Phi**	November 21, 1968	Truman State University	Kirksville, Missouri	Active	
426	**Upsilon Chi**	December 14, 1968	Northwest Missouri State University	Maryville, Missouri	Active	
429	Phi Chi	March 18, 1969 – 1976	Georgia State University	Atlanta, Georgia	Inactive	
430	Phi Psi	April 20, 1969 – 1974	Nebraska Wesleyan University	Lincoln, Nebraska	Inactive	
431	**Phi Omega**	April 20, 1969 – 1983; 1985	University of Dayton	Dayton, Ohio	Active	
433	Chi Omega	April 21, 1969 – 1974	Northeastern Illinois University	Chicago, Illinois	Inactive	
434	Psi Omega	April 26, 1969 – 1983	Knoxville College	Knoxville, Tennessee	Inactive	
150	**Beta Alpha**	May 3, 1969 – 2010; 2015	University of Tennessee at Chattanooga	Chattanooga, Tennessee	Active	
432	Chi Psi	May 4, 1969 – 1977	American University	Washington, D.C.	Inactive	
173	**Gamma Alpha**	May 11, 1969	James Madison University	Harrisonburg, Virginia	Active	
174	Gamma Beta	May 16, 1969	University of Wisconsin–Eau Claire	Eau Claire, Wisconsin	Inactive	
196	Delta Alpha	May 18, 1969 – 1987	University of the Cumberlands	Williamsburg, Kentucky	Inactive	
197	**Delta Beta**	May 22, 1969 – 2006; 2017	Alabama State University	Montgomery, Alabama	Active	
198	Delta Gamma	September 27, 1969 – 1988	Houston Baptist University	Houston, Texas	Inactive	
219	**Epsilon Alpha**	January 11, 1970 – 1973; 2009	University of Toledo	Toledo, Ohio	Active	
220	Epsilon Beta	April 19, 1970 – 1985	Abilene Christian University	Abilene, Texas	Inactive	
221	**Epsilon Gamma**	May 2, 1970	University of Central Missouri	Warrensburg, Missouri	Active	
222	**Epsilon Delta**	May 6, 1970 – 1974; 1982 – 1986; 1996	University of South Alabama	Mobile, Alabama	Active	
242	**Zeta Alpha**	May 10, 1970 – 1980; 2000	Rowan University	Glassboro, New Jersey	Active	
243	**Zeta Beta**	May 10, 1970	Augustana College	Rock Island, Illinois	Active	
245	Zeta Delta	May 10, 1970 – 1983	North Central College	Naperville, Illinois	Inactive	
246	Zeta Epsilon	May 16, 1970 – 1991; 1993–2014	Shorter University	Rome, Georgia	Inactive	
244	**Zeta Gamma**	May 17, 1970 – 1976; 1981–1992; 1997	Valdosta State University	Valdosta, Georgia	Active	
265	**Eta Alpha**	February 21, 1971 – 1991; 1998	Georgia College & State University	Milledgeville, Georgia	Active	
266	**Eta Beta**	March 21, 1971	University of North Carolina at Pembroke	Pembroke, North Carolina	Active	
267	**Eta Gamma**	April 24, 1971 – 1983; 2009	Southern Arkansas University	Magnolia, Arkansas	Active	
268	Eta Delta	May 1, 1971 – 1993	Grambling State University	Grambling, Louisiana	Inactive	
269	Eta Epsilon	May 2, 1971 – 1980	Augustana University	Sioux Falls, South Dakota	Inactive	
270	Eta Zeta	May 11, 1971 – 1998	Newberry College	Newberry, South Carolina	Inactive	
288	Theta Alpha	May 14, 1971 – 1986	Kean University	Union, New Jersey	Inactive	
289	Theta Beta	May 16, 1971 – 1976	University of Richmond	Richmond, Virginia	Inactive	
290	Theta Gamma	May 20, 1971 – 1986; 2004 – 2006	Fort Valley State University	Fort Valley, Georgia	Inactive	
291	Theta Delta	May 29, 1971 – 1974	Southern Oregon University	Ashland, Oregon	Inactive	
292	Theta Epsilon	March 18, 1972 – 1976	Wartburg College	Waverly, Iowa	Inactive	
294	**Theta Eta**	April 9, 1972 – 1994; 2014	Wright State University	Fairborn, Ohio	Active	
293	Theta Zeta	April 16, 1972 – 1977	University of Indianapolis	Indianapolis, Indiana	Inactive	
311	**Iota Alpha**	April 16, 1972 – 1976; 1986	Alma College	Alma, Michigan	Active	
312	**Iota Beta**	April 16, 1972 – 2000; 2011	North Carolina A&T State University	Greensboro, North Carolina	Active	
313	**Iota Gamma**	May 7, 1972 – 1998; 2001	University of Iowa	Iowa City, Iowa	Active	
314	Iota Delta	May 7, 1972 – 1983	Central Connecticut State University	New Britain, Connecticut	Inactive	
435	**Iota Epsilon**	February 21, 1973	University of North Carolina at Greensboro	Greensboro, North Carolina	Active	
436	Iota Zeta	April 17, 1973 – 1980	University of Bridgeport	Bridgeport, Connecticut	Inactive	
437	Iota Eta	April 21, 1973 – 1998	Central State University	Wilberforce, Ohio	Inactive	
438	Iota Theta	April 21, 1973 – 1978	Salem College	Salem, West Virginia	Inactive	
440	Kappa Beta	April 30, 1973 – 2005	Morris Brown College	Atlanta, Georgia	Colony	
439	Kappa Alpha	May 12, 1973 – 1997	Lipscomb University	Nashville, Tennessee	Inactive	
441	**Kappa Gamma**	April 5, 1974 – 1994; 1998	Berry College	Mount Berry, Georgia	Active	
442	Kappa Delta	April 5, 1974 – 1990; 2001–2004	Texas Southern University	Houston, Texas	Inactive	
443	Kappa Epsilon	April 5, 1974 – 1996	Olivet College	Olivet, Michigan	Inactive	
444	Kappa Zeta	May 4, 1974 – 1982; 1997	West Virginia Wesleyan College	Buckhannon, West Virginia	Inactive	
445	**Kappa Eta**	February 1, 1975	Arkansas Tech University	Russellville, Arkansas	Active	
446	Kappa Theta	April 11, 1975 – 1978	University of Texas–Pan American	Edinburg, Texas	Inactive	
447	**Kappa Iota**	March 27, 1976 – 1993; 1998	University of Central Arkansas	Conway, Arkansas	Active	
448	Lambda Alpha	April 2, 1976 – 1988	Trinity University	San Antonio, Texas	Inactive	
449	Lambda Beta	April 26, 1976 - 2025	Susquehanna University	Selinsgrove, Pennsylvania	Inactive	
450	**Lambda Gamma**	May 2, 1976	PennWest Edinboro	Edinboro, Pennsylvania	Active	
451	Lambda Delta	May 8, 1976 – 1978	Boise State University	Boise, Idaho	Inactive	
452	Lambda Epsilon	May 9, 1976 – 1987; 1990–1991	Dickinson State University	Dickinson, North Dakota	Inactive	
453	Lambda Zeta	October 17, 1976 – 1987; 1995–2000	Limestone College	Gaffney, South Carolina	Inactive	
454	Lambda Eta	April 15, 1977 – 1992	Western Oregon University	Monmouth, Oregon	Inactive	
455	Lambda Theta	April 15, 1977 – 1980	Xavier University of Louisiana	New Orleans, Louisiana	Inactive	
456	Lambda Iota	March 19, 1978 – 1985	Mount Senario College	Ladysmith, Wisconsin	Inactive	
457	Lambda Kappa	April 8, 1978 – 1986	Carthage College	Kenosha, Wisconsin	Inactive	
458	Mu Alpha	May 7, 1978 – 1980	Virginia Tech	Blacksburg, Virginia	Inactive	
460	**Mu Gamma**	December 3, 1978	Angelo State University	San Angelo, Texas	Active	
459	**Mu Beta**	March 24, 1979 – 1987; 2004	Winston-Salem State University	Winston-Salem, North Carolina	Active	
461	**Mu Delta**	March 31, 1979	Longwood University	Farmville, Virginia	Active	
462	Mu Zeta	April 29, 1979 – 1986	Western Connecticut State University	Danbury, Connecticut	Inactive	
464	**Mu Theta**	October 28, 1979	Tarleton State University	Stephenville, Texas	Active	
463	**Mu Eta**	November 11, 1979	University of Central Florida	Orlando, Florida	Active	
467	Mu Lambda	May 3, 1980 – 1984	Barton College	Wilson, North Carolina	Inactive	
465	Mu Iota	May 4, 1980 – 1983	Transylvania University	Lexington, Kentucky	Inactive	
465	Mu Kappa	Never chartered	Kentucky State University	Frankfort, Kentucky	Inactive	
468	Nu Alpha	May 11, 1980 – 1983	Augusta State University	Augusta, Georgia.	Inactive	
469	Nu Beta	May 19, 1980 – 2003	University of West Georgia	Carrollton, Georgia	Inactive	
470	**Nu Gamma**	May 9, 1981	Missouri Western State University	St. Joseph, Missouri	Inactive	
471	Nu Delta	March 26, 1982 – 1984	Northwestern Oklahoma State University	Alva, Oklahoma	Inactive	
472	Nu Epsilon	April 16, 1982 – 1984	University of Arkansas-Monticello	Monticello, Arkansas	Inactive	
473	Nu Zeta	May 24, 1982 – 1985; 1991 - 2021	California State University, Stanislaus	Turlock, California	Inactive	
474	**Nu Eta**	October 31, 1982 – 1987; 1998	University of Texas at San Antonio	San Antonio, Texas	Active	
475	**Nu Theta**	February 19, 1983 – 1987; 2011	Kennesaw State University	Cobb County, Georgia	Active	
476	**Nu Iota**	May 2, 1984 – 1991; 1995 – 2001; 2009	South Carolina State University	Orangeburg, South Carolina	Active	
477	**Nu Kappa**	January 27, 1985	Winthrop University	Rock Hill, South Carolina	Active	
478	Nu Lambda	March 16, 1985 – 1994; 2009 - 2022	University of Texas at El Paso	El Paso, Texas	Inactive	
479	Nu Mu	October 27, 1985 – 1988	McMurry University	Abilene, Texas	Inactive	
480	**Xi Alpha**	October 5, 1986	Hastings College	Hastings, Nebraska	Active	
481	**Xi Beta**	January 24, 1987 – 1990; 2011	Benedict College	Columbia, South Carolina	Active	
482	Xi Gamma	April 8, 1988 - 2023	Columbus State University	Columbus, Georgia	Inactive	
483	Xi Delta	April 2, 1989 - 2022	University of Nevada, Reno	Reno, Nevada	Inactive	
484	**Xi Epsilon**	November 10, 1990	Shepherd University	Shepherdstown, West Virginia	Active	
485	Xi Zeta	December 8, 1990	Northeastern State University	Tahlequah, Oklahoma	Inactive	
486	**Xi Eta**	February 2, 1991	Morehouse College	Atlanta, Georgia	Active	
487	**Xi Theta**	December 14, 1991	Radford University	Radford, Virginia	Active	
488	Xi Iota	February 1, 1992 – 2000	North Dakota State University	Fargo, North Dakota	Inactive	
489	**Xi Kappa**	January 30, 1993	VanderCook College of Music	Chicago, Illinois	Active	
490	**Xi Lambda**	March 11, 1994	Northern Kentucky University	Highland Heights, Kentucky	Active	
491	**Xi Mu**	March 19, 1994	University of Delaware	Newark, Delaware	Active	
492	Xi Nu	March 27, 1994	Stetson University	DeLand, Florida	Inactive	
493	**Omicron Alpha**	May 1, 1994	William Paterson University	Wayne, New Jersey	Active	
494	**Omicron Beta**	December 11, 1994	Nicholls State University	Thibodaux, Louisiana	Active	
495	**Omicron Gamma**	April 21, 1995	Florida A&M University	Tallahassee, Florida	Active	
496	Omicron Delta	April 22, 1995 – 2003; 2011–2013	Alabama A&M University	Normal, Alabama	Inactive	
497	**Omicron Epsilon**	April 29, 1995	Western Carolina University	Cullowhee, North Carolina	Active	
498	**Omicron Zeta**	September 9, 1995	Prairie View A&M University	Prairie View, Texas	Active	
499	**Omicron Eta**	April 13, 1996	Vincennes University	Vincennes, Indiana	Colony	
500	**Omicron Theta**	April 13, 1996 – 2002; 2011	New Jersey City University	Jersey City, New Jersey	Active	
501	**Omicron Iota**	April 21, 1996	University of Wisconsin–Platteville	Platteville, Wisconsin	Active	
502	Omicron Kappa	May 5, 1996 – 2012	Clark Atlanta University	Atlanta, Georgia	Inactive	
503	**Omicron Lambda**	May 27, 1996	Grambling State University	Grambling, Louisiana	Active	
504	Omicron Mu	November 16, 1996 – 2015	Clarion University of Pennsylvania	Clarion, Pennsylvania	Inactive	
505	**Omicron Nu**	May 1, 1997	Christopher Newport University	Newport News, Virginia	Active	
506	Omicron Xi	May 4, 1997 – August 31, 1997	Ambassador University	Big Sandy, Texas	Inactive	
507	Pi Alpha	May 2, 1998 – 2002	East Texas Baptist University	Marshall, Texas	Inactive	
508	**Pi Beta**	March 20, 1999	Hampton University	Hampton, Virginia	Active	
509	Pi Gamma	December 4, 1999	Bethune–Cookman University	Daytona Beach, Florida	Inactive	
510	**Pi Delta**	April 8, 2000	Vanderbilt University	Nashville, Tennessee	Active	
511	Pi Epsilon	March 31, 2001 – 2003	Bellarmine University	Louisville, Kentucky	Inactive	
512	**Pi Zeta**	November 18, 2001	Lindenwood University	St. Charles, Missouri	Active	
513	**Pi Eta**	December 8, 2001	Morgan State University	Baltimore, Maryland	Active	
514	Pi Theta	April 19, 2002 – 2004	University of Alabama at Birmingham	Birmingham, Alabama	Inactive	
515	**Pi Iota**	February 9, 2003	Elmhurst University	Elmhurst, Illinois	Active	
516	**Pi Kappa**	April 19, 2003 – 2009; 2012	Langston University	Langston, Oklahoma	Inactive	
517	Pi Lambda	April 24, 2004 – 2011	Alderson-Broaddus College	Philippi, West Virginia	Inactive	
518	Pi Mu	April 24, 2004	University of Tampa	Tampa, Florida	Inactive	
519	**Pi Nu**	April 30, 2004 – 2006; 2012	Jackson State University	Jackson, Mississippi	Active	
520	**Pi Xi**	November 13, 2004	Lee University	Cleveland, Tennessee	Active	
521	**Pi Omicron**	November 13, 2004	University of North Alabama	Florence, Alabama	Active	
522	Rho Alpha	November 28, 2004 – 2014	Lander University	Greenwood, South Carolina	Inactive	
523	Rho Beta	April 14, 2006 – 2014	North Carolina Central University	Durham, North Carolina	Inactive	
524	**Rho Gamma**	April 15, 2006	University of Arkansas at Pine Bluff	Pine Bluff, Arkansas	Active	
525	**Rho Delta**	October 1, 2006	Albany State University	Albany, Georgia	Active	
526	**Rho Epsilon**	May 10, 2007	Texas A&M University–Corpus Christi	Corpus Christi, Texas	Active	
527	**Rho Zeta**	May 11, 2007	McNeese State University	Lake Charles, Louisiana	Active	
528	**Rho Eta**	November 2, 2007	Florida International University	Miami, Florida	Active	
529	Rho Theta	November 4, 2007	Georgia Southern University–Armstrong Campus	Savannah, Georgia	Inactive	
530	Rho Iota	March 28, 2008 – 2009	Tougaloo College	Jackson, Mississippi	Inactive	
531	**Rho Kappa**	April 6, 2008 – 2021; 2025	Westminster Choir College of Rider University	Lawrence Township, New Jersey	Active	
532	**Rho Lambda**	April 13, 2008	University of Missouri-St. Louis	St. Louis, Missouri.	Active	
533	**Rho Mu**	October 25, 2008	Norfolk State University	Norfolk, Virginia	Active	
534	Rho Nu	November 2, 2008 – 2011	Coastal Carolina University	Conway, South Carolina	Inactive	
535	**Rho Xi**	April 18, 2009	Grand Valley State University	Allendale, Michigan	Active	
536	**Rho Omicron**	November 7, 2009 - 2025	George Mason University	Fairfax, Virginia	Inactive	
537	**Rho Pi**	November 15, 2009	Ohio Northern University	Ada, Ohio	Active	
538	**Sigma Alpha**	March 7, 2010	University of Massachusetts Amherst	Amherst, Massachusetts	Active	
539	**Sigma Beta**	March 27, 2010	University of North Carolina at Charlotte	Charlotte, North Carolina	Active	
540	**Sigma Gamma**	November 7, 2010	Kutztown University of Pennsylvania	Kutztown, Pennsylvania	Active	
541	**Sigma Delta**	November 6, 2011	Florida Atlantic University	Boca Raton, Florida	Active	
542	**Sigma Epsilon**	April 14, 2012	Indiana University–Purdue University Fort Wayne	Fort Wayne, Indiana	Active	
543	**Sigma Zeta**	November 4, 2012	Virginia State University	Ettrick, Virginia	Active	
544	**Sigma Eta**	December 7, 2012	Rollins College	Winter Park, Florida	Active	
545	**Sigma Theta**	April 13, 2013	Texas Southern University	Houston, Texas	Active	
546	**Sigma Iota**	April 21, 2013	University of Mary Hardin–Baylor	Belton, Texas	Active	
547	Sigma Kappa	April 28, 2013 – 2022	Delaware State University	Dover, Delaware	Inactive	
548	**Sigma Lambda**	March 30, 2014	Moravian University	Bethlehem, Pennsylvania	Active	
549	**Sigma Mu**	October 26, 2014	Clemson University	Clemson, South Carolina	Active	
550	**Sigma Nu**	December 11, 2015	Oakland University	Oakland County, Michigan	Active	
551	**Sigma Xi**	April 9, 2017	Millersville University of Pennsylvania	Millersville, Pennsylvania	Active	
552	**Sigma Omicron**	April 21, 2018	University of Virginia's College at Wise	Wise, Virginia	Active	
553	**Sigma Pi**	April 12, 2019	Texas Woman's University	Denton, Texas	Active	
