= Gilbert Raynolds Combs =

American classical composer

Gilbert Raynolds Combs (January 5, 1863 – 1934) was an American pianist, organist, and player of stringed instruments; a composer of music for orchestra, piano, voice, and violin; a teacher; and an orchestral and chorus conductor. Gilbert Combs was founder of the Combs Broad Street Conservatory of Music in Philadelphia in 1885, one of the founders and president of Phi Mu Alpha Sinfonia national music fraternity, founder and vice president of the National Association of Schools of Music, and a Mason.

== Early life and career ==
Gilbert Raynolds Combs was born to a musical family in Philadelphia. His father, Gilbert Combs, was one of the Vice Presidents of the Handel and Haydn Society in 1858 and served on the committee appointed by the United Presbyterian Church General Assembly to prepare its “Book of Praise” in 1872. He was also a distinguished pianist, organist, and composer. Gilbert Raynolds Combs showed a talent for music very early in life and received careful training. He studied music first under his father, and then under several American and European masters. He was educated at Eastburn Academy in Philadelphia. Though originally intended for the medical profession, he made such rapid progress, both at home and in Europe, that he decided to adopt music as his life-work.

From his fifteenth to his twenty-second year Combs was actively engaged in playing the organ, piano and ‘cello; teaching piano and violin; and directing orchestras, operatic companies and choruses. For twelve years he was organist at the Immanuel Presbyterian Church, later musical director at the South Broad Street Baptist Church and for six years organist at the Tenth Presbyterian Church.

== The Combs Broad Street Conservatory of Music ==
Gilbert Combs wrote that the appreciation of classical music in America was largely due to the American conservatories, “which have forced good music on their pupils and excluded such music as many private teachers are obliged to use in order to retain their pupils.” In addition to class instruction, he advocated private lessons from artist teachers of international reputation to develop the higher qualities of musicianship. Most music schools in America today follow this model, which was intentionally developed by conservatory directors like Combs and George Chadwick of the New England Conservatory, who modeled their schools after the European conservatories so that Americans could obtain an equivalent to the European education in their own country.

Gilbert Combs’ success and popularity as a teacher, and his desire to provide pupils with these advantages, led him to found the Combs Broad Street Conservatory of Music in Philadelphia. Combs founded the Conservatory in 1885 and remained its head for many years. The Conservatory was considered successful from the outset. Its teaching-force numbered about 80, and the number of pupils over 2,300. The Conservatory occupied five buildings on South Broad Street. It was highly organized for efficiency and offered a wide range of opportunity for instruction from elementary to advanced grades. Its students had certain privileges at the University of Pennsylvania. Two orchestras were maintained, one of 85 members, the other of 60.

== Works ==
As composer Gilbert Combs was best known by his piano-pieces, but wrote in all forms. The ‘Erato’ for piano, dedicated to Leopold Godowsky, the ‘Romance,’ op. 17, ‘Norwegian Dance,’ ‘Autumn’ and ‘Wind of Memory’ were all well known. His ‘Reverie,’ op. 7, for violin and piano, was dedicated to and often played by Henry Schradieck, the famed violin teacher. His Scotch and Irish songs, and many instructive pieces for piano and violin were much used. His Science of Piano-Playing and Introductory Steps to the Science of Piano-Playing were published in loose-leaf ledger form. His ‘Dramatis Symphony’ was first performed in 1908. The orchestral setting for ‘Sheherazade,’ an oriental drama, was given at the Metropolitan Opera House in Philadelphia, in May, 1918.

== Affiliations ==
Combs was one of the founders of Phi Mu Alpha Sinfonia. The Sinfonia became national when he accepted a chapter at the Broad Street Conservatory on October 6, 1900. Combs was Supreme Treasurer from 1901–1902 and 1903–1904; and Supreme President from 1902–1903 and 1914–1915. He was part of the movement among conservatory directors to model their society after the social, intellectual, and artistic clubs devoted to Enlightenment Idealism. In this way, the students at their conservatories could have every benefit of their own experiences in the European conservatories. Combs wrote that the musical societies and fraternities that made up conservatory life helped the Conservatories rise “to the completely first-class.”

As Supreme President of the Sinfonia Gilbert Combs declared his optimism in the Fraternity’s future growth and suggested the idea of international expansion. He believed that the Sinfonia expanded because it responded to a unique sensitiveness and sensibility of musicians, and that its present and future growth would disprove the critics’ impressions “that musicians spend much of their time in mutual quarrellings and recriminations.”

Combs was “a member of all Masonic organizations.” The Pennsylvania Grand Lodge, having record of his attendance but not record of his initiation, believes that he may have been made a Mason while he was studying in Europe. His Ritualistic Music for the 32nd Degree of the Ancient and Accepted Scottish Rite, for men's voices and organ, was written for the Philadelphia Consistory and first presented in 1917.
