= Darhyl S. Ramsey =

Professor of music at the University of North Texas

Darhyl S. Ramsey is a professor of music in the Division of Music Education at the University of North Texas College of Music.

== Education ==
Ramsey earned his Bachelor of Music degree from Carson-Newman College and his Masters and PhD in Music Education are from University of Iowa.

== Career ==
His teaching experiences include public school in Virginia; university teaching at Pennsylvania State University, where he was the Assistant Director of the Penn State Blue Band; and teaching at the University of Texas at San Antonio. At UNT he teaches instrumental methods and numerous graduate courses including history of music education, African American music, principles of music learning, contemporary trends in music education, and psychology of music. He administers the master of music education program and is chair of numerous dissertations.

He has written numerous articles and performed presentations throughout the country and at several international conferences. He has also adjudicated bands in Texas and throughout the country. He is a member of MENC, TMEA, Kappa Kappa Psi and served as the National President of Phi Mu Alpha Sinfonia fraternity from 2000-2003.

Ramsey helped to start the Start Up the Band project in 1999. The project aims to change the lives of disadvantaged children by supplying them with musical instruments and tuition.

== Works ==
Ramsey is co-author of Teaching Music through Performance in Beginning Band. This book includes analyses of fifty-three Grade 1 works, breaking each piece down into Entry Level, Intermediate Level, and Advanced Level repertoire categories.
