= Kentucky Institute for International Studies =

- Formation: 1975; 51 years ago
- Region served: Kentucky, United States

The Kentucky Institute for International Studies or KIIS (pronounced like "keys") is a consortium of public and private colleges and universities in Kentucky and surrounding states which administers a variety of international studies programs in Central America, Europe, South America, Africa, Asia, and the Middle East. Founded in 1975, in a collaborative effort by Murray State University, Western Kentucky University, and Eastern Kentucky University, the Kentucky Institute for International Studies (KIIS) now includes 25+ member institutions.

== Member institutions ==
- Art Academy of Cincinnati
- Ball State University
- Bellarmine University
- Berea College
- Campbellsville University
- Centre College
- Eastern Kentucky University
- East Tennessee State University
- Georgetown College
- Kentucky Community and Technical College System (KCTCS)
- Kentucky State University
- Kentucky Wesleyan College
- Lincoln Memorial University
- Marshall University
- Morehead State University
- Murray State University
- Northern Kentucky University
- Shawnee State University
- Thomas More University
- Transylvania University
- Union Commonwealth University
- University of Kentucky
- University of Louisville
- University of Pikeville
- Western Kentucky University

== Study Abroad Programs ==
=== Winter Programs ===
- Greece Winter
- Italy Winter
- Maya Mexico Winter
- Paris-Munich Winter
- Zanzibar Winter

=== Summer Programs ===
- Amsterdam & Barcelona Summer
- Argentina Summer
- Austria Summer
- Caribbean Summer
- Costa Rica Summer
- Egypt Summer
- Greece Summer
- Italy Summer
- Japan Summer
- Japan-Korea Pop Summer
- Paris 1 Summer
- Paris 2 Summer
- Prague Summer
- Salzburg Summer
- Slavic Europe: Poland Summer
- Spain 1 Summer
- Spain 2 Summer
- Taiwan Summer
- Tanzania Summer
- Turkey Summer

=== Spring Semester Program ===
- Spain Spring Semester
