= Ossian E. Mills =

American fraternity founder (1856–1920)

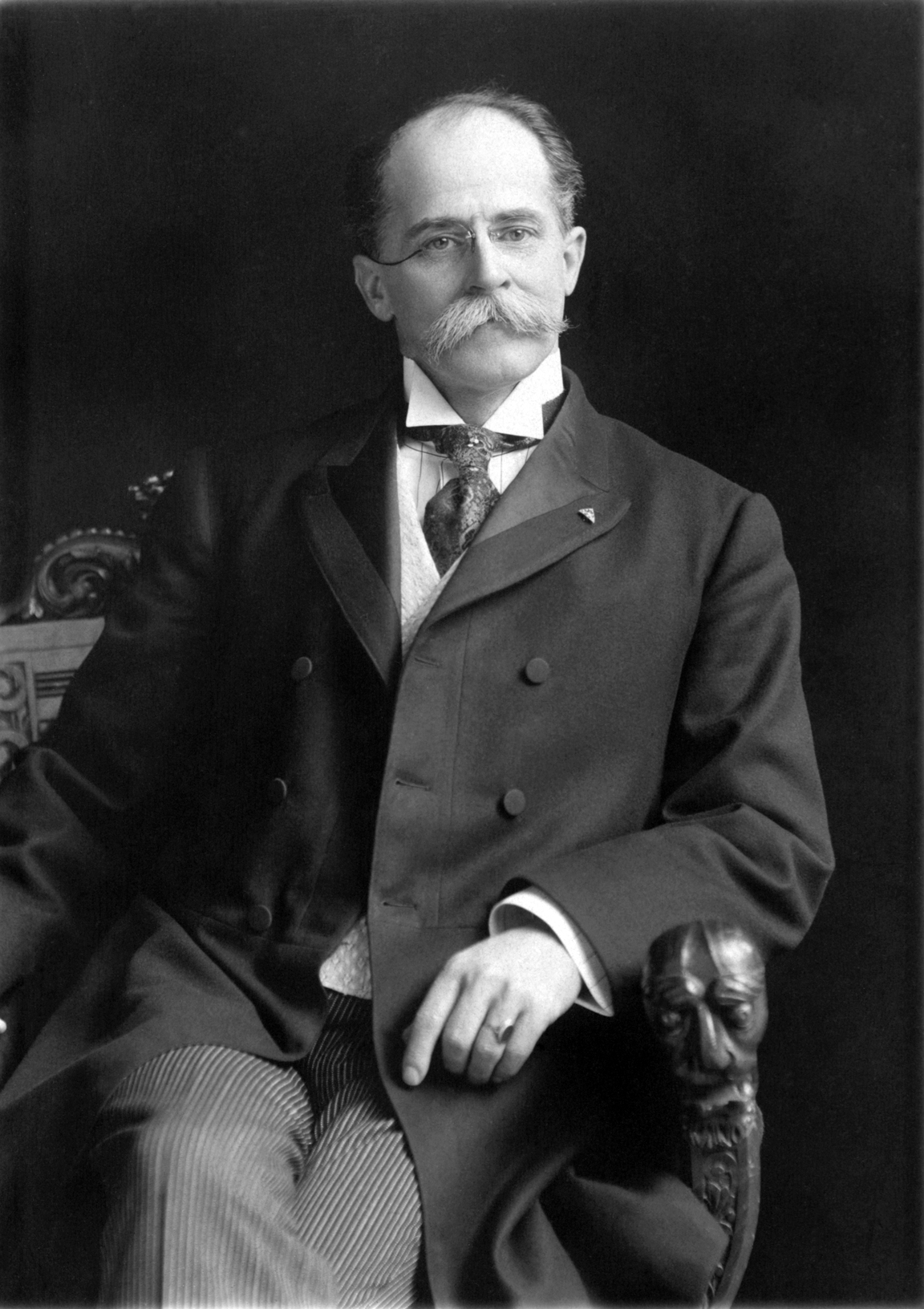
- Born: Ossian Everett Mills; February 16, 1856; Thompson, Connecticut, US
- Died: December 26, 1920 (aged 64); Wellesley, Massachusetts, US
- Resting place: Thompson, Connecticut
- Occupation: College administrator (Bursar)
- Employer: New England Conservatory
- Known for: Founder of Phi Mu Alpha Sinfonia
- Spouse: Clara Cleveland Carper (1863–1952)
- Children: 1

Ossian Everett Mills (February 16, 1856 – December 26, 1920) was the founder of Phi Mu Alpha Sinfonia fraternity at the New England Conservatory of Music in 1898.

== Early life ==
Mills was born in Thompson Connecticut on February 16, 1856. His parents were Maria and Andrew Mills who were musically inclined. He had six siblings, including Clinton James Mills who became an administrator at New England Conservatory of Music.

Mills was educated at Woodstock Academy. He moved to Boston, Massachusetts by 1879 where he studied voice at the New England Conservatory of Music.

== Music career ==
Mills was employed by the New England Conservatory of Music. He was promoted to the position of bursar and held that position until his death.

He founded the Sinfonia Club (now Phi Mu Alpha Sinfonia music fraternity) at the conservatory on October 6, 1898, and was elected its treasurer. The music club expanded to become a national fraternity for music students and musicians in 1900. Mills was the first president of the national fraternity, serving from 1901 to 1902 and again from 1904 to 1905. At the end of his first term as president, the fraternity's constitution was changed to name him Grand Supreme President for life.

Mills was a tenor with the Handel and Hayden Society in Boston.

== Personal life ==
As a student, Mills sang with the noted contralto Carrie Cleveland Carper. They married in April 1883. They had a son, Homer, in 1888.

He served on the board of trustees of the Beneficent Society of the New England Conservatory Music and was elected its auditor in 1895 and its assistant treasurer in 1898.

Mills was an active member of the Christian Endeavor Society, holding prayer meetings at the conservatory starting in 1886. That year, he founded and organized the students' annual Easter and Christmas "Song and Flower Mission" that visited the sick in Boston's city hospital. He organized this charity for nearly thirty years, involving student musicians and singers and volunteers helping to gather flowers after church services to distribute to each patient. This became "the first large-scale and ongoing use of music to aid the sick in America." Phi Mu Alpha Sinfonia later revived the Song and Flower Mission as a national program, renamed the Ossian Everett Mills Music Mission in his honor.

In 1900, he was elected to the committee of Boston's Ward 12.

He died of pneumonia at his home in Wellesley, Massachusetts on December 20, 1920, after several days of illness. He was buried in Thompson, Connecticut. On December 28, 1928, Phi Mu Alpha Sinfonia erected a memorial at Mill's grave, with the epitaph, “Sacrifice, Secret Zeal, and Truth.”

== Legacy ==
- Phi Mu Alpha has chartered 451 collegiate chapters at 445 colleges and universities across the United States, of which 249 are currently active.
- The Mills Music Mission was named in his honor and continues to provide musical visits to hospitals across the United States.
