= Phi Mu Alpha Sinfonia =

American collegiate music fraternity

- ΦΜΑ
- Founded: October 6, 1898; 128 years ago New England Conservatory of Music
- Type: Social
- Affiliation: National Interfraternity Music Council (NIMC)
- Former affiliation: PFA
- Status: Active
- Emphasis: Music
- Scope: National (United States)
- Member badge
- Colors: Red, Black, Gold
- Flower: Chrysanthemum
- Publication: The Sinfonian
- Philanthropy: Mills Music Mission
- Chapters: 231
- Nickname: Sinfonia
- Headquarters: 10600 Old State Road; Evansville, Indiana 47711; United States
- Website: Sinfonia.org

Phi Mu Alpha Sinfonia (ΦΜΑ) is an American collegiate social fraternity with an emphasis in music. It was founded as the Sinfonia Club at the New England Conservatory of Music on October 6, 1898, by Ossian Everett Mills.

The fraternity is open to men "who, through a love for music, can assist in the fulfillment of [its] object and ideals either by adopting music as a profession or by working to advance the cause of music in America." Phi Mu Alpha has initiated more than 260,000 members, known as Sinfonians, and as of 2022 had over 4,000 active collegiate members in 231 collegiate chapters throughout the United States.

The organization's national headquarters are located at the Lyrecrest estate in Evansville, Indiana. Phi Mu Alpha operates independently from any of the major American intercollegiate governing bodies for fraternities, though it had been a member of the Professional Fraternity Association from 1954 to 2007.

The fraternity has local, regional, and national levels of governance. Phi Mu Alpha also charters local alumni associations in a particular geographic area. Chapters and alumni associations are grouped into provinces. A National Executive Committee, elected by a National Assembly at each triennial National Convention, governs the national organization.

== History ==
=== Founding ===
Phi Mu Alpha Sinfonia was founded as the Sinfonia Club by Ossian Everett Mills, the bursar of the New England Conservatory of Music in Boston. Mills was profoundly interested in the physical, mental, moral, and spiritual development of the conservatory's students and had a tradition of hosting devotional meetings going back as far as 1886. Mills sought to encourage the personal development of the young men at the conservatory through wholesome social interaction among them, leading him to suggest that the older students of the conservatory invite the newer students to a social reception on September 22, 1898. Several men who attended the reception began to discuss the possibility of organizing a more permanent social club, and a meeting was planned for October 6, 1898, for that purpose.

The fraternity attributes the name "Sinfonia" to prominent American composer George Whitefield Chadwick, then director of the conservatory. Chadwick was elected as the second honorary member of the club after Ossian Mills, and suggested the name "Sinfonia" from a student organization to which he had belonged in Leipzig, Germany. Before 1947, the legal corporate name of the fraternity was Sinfonia Fraternity of America, though the Greek letters Phi, Mu, and Alpha had been associated with the fraternity since at least 1904. The delegates to the 29th National Convention in 1946 approved changing the corporate name to Phi Mu Alpha Sinfonia Fraternity of America, which it remains today.

=== Expansion ===
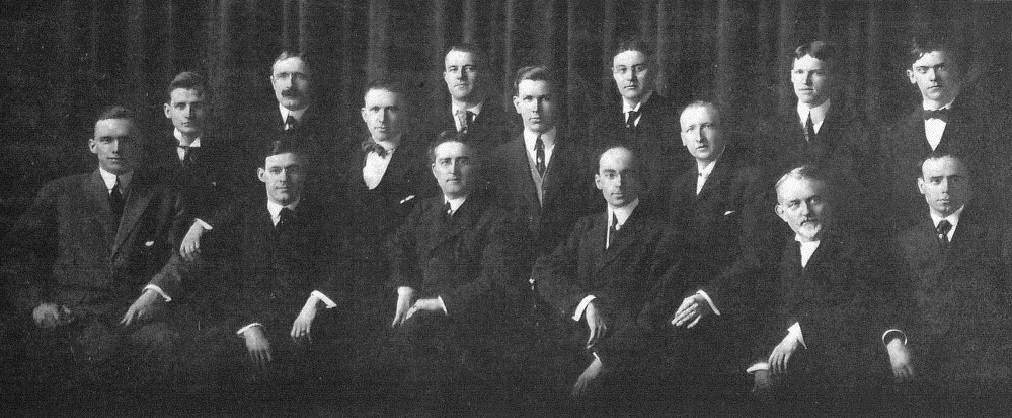
The Zeta Chapter at the University of Missouri School of Music in 1908

The Sinfonia Club became a national fraternity on October 6, 1900, with the admission of a group of men at the Broad Street Conservatory of Music in Philadelphia, under the direction of Gilbert Raynolds Combs. The traditional date given in fraternity resources for the founding of the Beta chapter at Broad Street Conservatory is October 6, 1900. However, while the petitioning letter submitted by the men from Philadelphia is dated October 6, a notation made by Ralph Howard Pendleton, secretary of Alpha chapter at the New England Conservatory, at the bottom of the letter indicates that the petition was not approved until October 8.

For the next two decades, Phi Mu Alpha grew and emphasized developing high character among male musicians. Percy Jewett Burrell, sixth Supreme President (1907–1914), was influential during its formative years because of his long tenure in office and extensive writings. Burrell wrote many articles calling for members to develop within themselves the noble virtues espoused by the fraternity's exoteric and esoteric teachings.

As the fraternity grew in both the number of members and chapters, so did its emphasis on the advancement of music. In 1927, the original Object statement was altered so that "to advance the cause of music in America" was put in a place of prominence. After the American victory in World War II, the young men who returned from battle to re-enter the nation's universities through the benefits of the G.I. Bill were less interested in an organization devoted to upholding noble ideals—ideals that seemed naive given the men's wartime experiences—than they were in the practical matter of finding civilian employment. This, combined with the fact that many of Phi Mu Alpha's national leaders at the time were heavily involved in state and local music educators' professional organizations, led the fraternity to become increasingly concerned with the advancement of its members in the music profession (especially in music education) in addition to the advancement of music in general. The professional period of the fraternity's history culminated in 1970 when its leaders began marketing it as "The Professional Fraternity for Men in Music" and when a new statement of purpose was adopted that began, "The primary purpose of this Fraternity shall be to encourage and actively promote the highest standards of creativity, performance, education, and research in music in America."

=== Title IX and coed membership ===
Title IX of the Education Amendments of 1972, enacted on June 23, 1972, prohibits discrimination based on gender in educational programs receiving federal funding. This prohibition extends to professional societies for students enrolled at universities that receive federal funds for student financial aid or other programs. However, social organizations, such as social fraternities and sororities, are specifically exempted. Phi Mu Alpha's initial response to Title IX was to allow chapters, beginning in 1976, to initiate women on a case-by-case basis as universities began questioning Phi Mu Alpha's single-sex membership policy.

In 1983, the fraternity successfully petitioned for an exemption from Title IX from the U.S. Department of Education based on its historical existence as a social organization, but some members felt that the fraternity should continue as a professional organization and fully embrace a coed membership policy. The issue came to a head at the 45th National Convention in 1985 when the fraternity's National Assembly voted to restore Phi Mu Alpha to its original status as a male-only social fraternity. Despite this action, the fraternity did not change its statement of purpose (now known as the Object) to reflect the change in status until 2003, and it remained a member of the Professional Fraternity Association until 2007.

Since its centennial in 1998, Phi Mu Alpha has re-embraced the vision of its founders as an organization devoted primarily to the character development of its members. The fraternity aims to build "musicianly men" into "manly musicians" who will go out into the world and advance the cause of music in their fields of influence, whether that be as music professionals, through other professions, or through philanthropy and advocacy in support of the musical arts. The number of collegiate members and active chapters has steadily grown since 2000.

== Insignia and symbols ==
The official colors of Phi Mu Alpha are red, black, and gold. The Sinfonia Club adopted the colors red and black on March 7, 1900, and used them as the color motif of the decorations for its first club room. Phi Mu Alpha adopted red and black as its official colors at its 1st National Convention in 1901. Gold was adopted as the third color of the fraternity at the 10th National Convention in 1910. Phi Mu Alpha's official flower is the chrysanthemum, adopted at the 1st National Convention in 1901. The official fraternity flag consists of a red field with the coat of arms centered on a wide black diagonal stripe extending from the upper hoist to the lower fly.

=== Coat of arms ===
Phi Mu Alpha's coat of arms was adopted at the 10th National Convention in 1910. The escutcheon (shield) consists of a red saltire (or Saint Andrew's Cross) on a field of gold. Centered is a symbol similar to the fraternity's membership pin, though differing in that, instead of 7 red and white circles/stones along each side of the triangle, there are 13 monochromatic circles along each side. The saltire divides the escutcheon into four sections. In the dexter section (bearer's right or viewer's left) are clasped hands, in the sinister section (bearer's left or viewer's right) are panpipes, and in the base section (bottom) is a lamp. The chief section (top) contains no charge, but the point of the centered triangular symbol crosses into it. Two fanfare trumpets crossing behind the escutcheon with the bells at the top and mouthpieces at the bottom serve as supporters. Above the escutcheon is decorative mantling and a lyre as the crest. Below is a scroll divided into three sections by the leadpipes of the fanfare trumpets. In the center section is the word Sinfonia, and the left and right sections display the numbers 18 and 98, respectively, representing the founding year of the fraternity: 1898.

=== Membership pins ===
The essential design of Phi Mu Alpha's official membership badge (pin) was adopted at the 1st National Convention in 1901. The design consisted of an upward-pointing equilateral triangle with a gold Old English S on a field of black enamel, surrounded by twelve pearls and six rubies. There were three pearls at each tip, with two rubies separated by one pearl on each side. The design was modified slightly in 1910 by reducing the size of the old-English S to allow room for the Greek letter Φ in the top corner, Μ in the lower left corner, and Α in the lower right corner. This design remains in use today, though garnets are used instead of rubies. The official membership badge is only worn by initiated members of the fraternity (collegiate, alumni, or honorary).

Probationary members are required to wear a special probationary membership pin "at all reasonable times". The design of the probationary membership pin is an upward-pointing equilateral triangle of black enamel surrounded by a border of red enamel, with a thin gold border separating the red and black enamel and another thin gold border around the outside of the pin surrounding the red enamel.

== Publications ==
In addition to the numerous manuals, guides, and policy documents produced by the fraternity, historically, Phi Mu Alpha has issued the following major publications:

- The Sinfonian, the official publication of the fraternity in the form of a semi-annual magazine sent to all collegiate members through their chapters and to alumni who have purchased a subscription.
- The Red & Black, a newsletter sent to all collegiate members and available on the fraternity's website.
- Sinfonia Resonance, a free electronic newsletter sent to all alumni members with valid e-mail addresses on file with the fraternity.
- Themes for Brotherhood, a manual for probationary members.
- Sinfonia Songs, a book of fraternity songs for members published since 1908; currently in its sixth edition.
- Phi Mu Alpha Sinfonia: A Centennial History, 2nd Edition, is a detailed history of the fraternity from its founding through 1998.

Since the spring of 2014, the fraternity has not issued any periodical publications.

== Philanthropy ==
Phi Mu Alpha's national philanthropy is the Ossian Everett Mills Music Mission. Created in 1998, the Mills Music Mission is a modern-day revival of a practice originated by the fraternity's founder, Ossian Everett Mills, in the late 19th century. Mills was the organizer of a "Flower Mission" in Boston in which musicians and assistants would go to Boston's hospitals on Christmas and Easter to sing, play music, and give recitations. The activity was referred to as the "Flower Mission" because, before going to the hospitals, the participants would collect flowers from churches after the morning services and distribute them to the patients they visited. The Mills Music Mission was adopted as Phi Mu Alpha's official national philanthropy in 2003. The focus of this project is rare among fraternity philanthropies since, instead of raising funds to support a selected charity, the fraternity uses the unique talents and interests of its members to personally interact with and lift the spirits of those in need.

=== Sinfonia Educational Foundation ===
The Sinfonia Educational Foundation (SEF) is the philanthropic arm of Phi Mu Alpha Sinfonia fraternity. The mission of the SEF is to enrich the lives of collegiate Sinfonians and to advance music in America by supporting scholarship, education, and the development of leadership and noble ideals among future generations of musicians and supporters of music in America.

== Members ==
Membership in Phi Mu Alpha is divided into four classes: probationary, collegiate, alumni, and honorary. Probationary members are those who are participating in an educational program in preparation for initiation as full, active collegiate members. Collegiate members transfer to alumni membership after they graduate or otherwise leave the university while in good standing with the fraternity. Honorary membership can be bestowed under guidelines established by the fraternity's national constitution; many prominent musicians and patrons of music, such as Aaron Copland, Duke Ellington, and Andrew Carnegie are honorary Sinfonians.

=== Probationary ===
Probationary membership is a prerequisite for initiation as a collegiate member. A man becomes a probationary member by accepting an invitation to membership extended to him by a collegiate chapter and by participating in the fraternity's official ceremony for pledging. It is not required that a candidate for probationary membership have an academic major or minor in music or be enrolled in a music course, though most chapters have traditionally had a majority of their members come from the music major ranks of their sheltering institutions.

During the probationary program, probationary members learn basic information about the organization and are instructed in the values and ideals of the fraternity. The purpose of the membership education program is to prepare probationary members to assume all of the duties and responsibilities of full membership in the fraternity.

Probationary membership may be terminated by the probationary member through resignation or by the chapter through a retention vote in which the probationary member fails to receive the support of at least three-fourths of the chapter's members.

=== Collegiate ===
Probationary members who complete the membership education program, pay the prescribed initiation fee, and are approved by a vote of the chapter are eligible to become collegiate members through participation in the fraternity's initiation ritual. Collegiate members hold voting rights in their respective chapters and may hold fraternity offices specifically reserved for collegiate members. They are also eligible for the many financial assistance programs of the Sinfonia Educational Foundation, such as scholarships, study abroad grants, and travel reimbursement grants for attendance at national fraternity events with educational components. Collegiate members are required to pay national per capita taxes (i.e., dues) to the fraternity, pay local dues assessed by the chapter, and attend all chapter meetings and activities.

Once initiated, membership in the fraternity is for life. An initiated member may not resign his membership in the fraternity, though he may be suspended or expelled from membership for misconduct.

=== Alumni ===
Upon leaving the chapter's sheltering institution (e.g., through graduation, transfer, etc.), collegiate members may transfer to alumni membership. Faculty and staff members of the sheltering institution who are initiated as collegiate members may transfer to alumni membership at any time. Alumni members retain all the rights and privileges of membership in the fraternity except for voting rights in a collegiate chapter and eligibility to hold offices specifically reserved for collegiate members. Alumni members are under no further financial obligation to the fraternity or to any chapter insofar as they remain members of the fraternity in good standing, regardless of financial contributions. However, alumni members are encouraged to make regular contributions to the Sinfonia Educational Foundation, and if an alumni member chooses to join an alumni association he may assume an obligation to pay dues to the association.

=== Honorary ===
Chapters may initiate men into honorary membership. Non-Sinfonian candidates must be distinguished male musicians, music educators, or patrons of music, and upon initiation, they are considered honorary members of both the chapter and the fraternity. A Sinfonian may be initiated as an honorary member of a chapter for long-standing support and outstanding contributions. The National Executive Committee may initiate men as national honorary members into the honorary Alpha Alpha Chapter. Honorary membership is equivalent to alumni membership with regards the rights and obligations conferred. It is not possible to confer honorary membership posthumously.

=== Transgender Sinfonians ===
In October 2016, the National Executive Council (NEC) requested input on potentially updating the transgender policies of the Fraternity, which had previously been interpreted as requiring members to be both "legally and medically male" at the time of probationary membership and initiation. As a result of this feedback, the NEC released an advisory statement that they interpreted the membership requirements to include "any individual who identifies consistently and in good faith as a man".

=== Notable members ===
Over a century old, Phi Mu Alpha has admitted men from all walks of life, some of whom have achieved notability in fields such as music, television, film, science, government, and literature. Among these famous Sinfonians are famous composers such as Frank Ticheli, Morten Lauridsen, Arnold Schoenberg, John Philip Sousa, John Mackey, and Clifton Williams, television personalities Fred Rogers (of Mister Rogers' Neighborhood) and Andy Griffith, jazz musicians Bill Evans, Duke Ellington, Count Basie, Maynard Ferguson, Chuck Mangione, Wayne Bergeron, Gordon Goodwin and Cannonball Adderley, rock musician Bo Diddley, Boston Pops conductor Keith Lockhart, philanthropists Andrew Carnegie and George Eastman, politicians including 1948 Presidential candidate Thomas Dewey and New York City mayor Fiorello La Guardia, folk singer and actor Burl Ives, tenor Luciano Pavarotti, American Idol winner Ruben Studdard, and American actor J.K. Simmons.

== Chapters ==
=== Collegiate chapters ===
Phi Mu Alpha has chartered 451 collegiate chapters at 445 colleges and universities across the United States in its history, of which 249 are currently active. Alpha chapter at the founding New England Conservatory was active from 1898 to 1977. It was reactivated in 1991 but subsequently became inactive again in 1995 and remains so today. The Iota chapter at Northwestern University in Evanston, Illinois was chartered on April 29, 1910 and is the oldest continuously active chapter of the fraternity.

Chapters are formed by the granting of charters to petitioning groups at qualified institutions of higher education. The only basic qualification for an institution to house a chapter of Phi Mu Alpha is that it offers a four-year degree in music. Before receiving a charter, petitioning groups must seek recognition as a colony. After being recognized as a colony, the petitioning group must complete the fraternity's Colony Program, which consists of numerous activities designed to help the group organize itself as an effective and viable branch of the fraternity. Once chartered, collegiate chapters have the authority to conduct activities in the name of the fraternity to further its Object.

At a minimum, chapters are required to annually sponsor at least one program devoted exclusively to the music of American composers and to celebrate Founder's Day (October 6) and Chapter Day (the chartering date of the chapter). Chapters are also encouraged to meet the requirements of the fraternity's chapter visitations program, which recognizes chapters annually for achievement in the areas of chapter operations, membership development, alumni relations, musical achievement, province interaction, special projects, and fraternal tradition.

Unlike most collegiate fraternities, the vast majority of chapters of Phi Mu Alpha do not provide communal housing for their members as a means to accomplish the goals of social development and character building.

=== Alumni associations ===
While the core values of the fraternity are taught during probationary and collegiate membership, Sinfonians are expected to live out those values throughout their lives in support of the fraternity's Object. To organize its alumni for that purpose, Phi Mu Alpha charters alumni associations. There are currently 19 active alumni associations throughout the United States. As stated in the fraternity's National Constitution,

Alumni associations shall encourage and enable alumni members to retain identity with the Fraternity, shall maintain a continuing spirit of brotherhood among men of music, shall act in support of collegiate chapters, shall engage in or support such musical projects in the community as promote the ideals of the Fraternity, shall aid deserving students of music in whatever way possible, and shall encourage and support local music programs.

Alumni associations may elect to membership any alumni or honorary member of the fraternity in good standing. Membership in an alumni association is voluntary and is not required for an alumnus to remain a member of the fraternity in good standing. Alumni associations cannot initiate men into the fraternity.

The structure and activities of the alumni associations are left almost entirely to their members. Unlike collegiate chapters, which must adhere to the fraternity's General Regulations for Collegiate Chapters, alumni associations are free to choose their governance structures, including what officers they have, how often they hold meetings, etc.

== Governance ==
=== National conventions and the National Assembly ===
The first national convention of Phi Mu Alpha was held April 16–20, 1901, during which the fraternity was officially founded as a national organization and its first national constitution was adopted. From 1901 through 1920, conventions were held annually except in 1906 (scheduled but not held), and 1917–18 (due to World War I). From 1920 through 1964, conventions were held biennially except that no convention was held in 1942 or 1944 due to World War II. From 1926 to 1948, the majority of national conventions were held simultaneously with those of the Music Teachers National Association (MTNA). Since 1964, national conventions have been held triennially, except in 2021, which was rescheduled to 2022 due to the COVID-19 pandemic.

National conventions traditionally include seminars on fraternal tradition and leadership, forums with candidates for national office, gala banquets, musical performances by Sinfonian ensembles, and numerous other social events. One of the most important functions of the convention is to facilitate business sessions to make changes to the fraternity's governing documents, set national policies, and elect national officers for the following triennium. The delegate body that makes these decisions at the national convention is known as the National Assembly, which consists of the members of the National Executive Committee, the PGs, and the CPRs.

=== National Executive Committee ===
The National Executive Committee (NEC) is Phi Mu Alpha's primary governing body. The members of the NEC are the National President, the National Vice President, two committeemen-at-large, a National Collegiate Representative (NCR), the Chairman of the Province Governors' (PGs') Council, and the Chairman of the Collegiate Province Representatives' (CPRs') Council. Each of these officers holds office for three years except for the committeemen-at-large who hold staggered terms of six years each, one being elected every three years. The officers are elected by the National Assembly at each national convention, except that the PG's Council and the CPR's Council elect their chairmen in caucus meetings at the national convention.

Supreme/National Presidents of Phi Mu Alpha Sinfonia
Name	Initiating chapter and year	Term
Ossian Everett Mills	Alpha chapter, 1898	1901–1902
Gilbert Raynolds Combs	Beta chapter, 1900	1902–1903
George C. Williams	Delta chapter, 1903	1903–1904
Ossian Everett Mills	Alpha chapter, 1898	1904–1905
Winthrop S. Sterling	Eta chapter, 1903	1905–1907
Percy Jewett Burrell	Alpha chapter, 1899	1907–1914
Gilbert Raynolds Combs	Beta chapter, 1900	1914–1915
F. Otis Drayton	Alpha chapter, 1912	1915–1918
Burleigh E. Jacobs	Epsilon chapter, 1914	1918–1919
Chester R. Murray	Zeta chapter, 1909	1919–1920
Justin E. Williams	Alpha chapter, 1914	1920–1922
Peter W. Dykema	Phi chapter, 1921	1922–1928
Aubrey W. Martin	Alpha Theta chapter, 1923	1928–1932
James Thomas Quarles	Delta chapter, 1924	1932–1936
Herbert Kimbrough	Chi chapter, 1921	1936–1938
Norval Church	Phi chapter, 1923	1938–1942
Alvah A. Beecher	Alpha Lambda chapter, 1925	1942–1946
Albert Lukken	Alpha Chi chapter, 1927	1946–1950
Archie N. Jones	Alpha Mu chapter, 1929	1950–1960
William B. McBride	Omega chapter, 1928	1960–1964
Harry Robert Wilson	Tau chapter, 1924	1964–1967
Carl M. Neumeyer	Gamma Delta chapter, 1938	1967–1970
Robert C. Soule	Beta Gamma chapter, 1944	1970–1973
J. Eugene Duncan	Epsilon Nu chapter, 1950	1973–1976
Lucien P. Stark	Alpha Beta chapter, 1947	1976–1979
Emile H. Serposs	Beta Gamma chapter, 1944	1979–1982
Maurice I. Laney	Beta Iota chapter, 1940	1982–1985
William B. Dederer	Rho Chi chapter, 1967	1985–1988
T. Jervis Underwood	Gamma Theta chapter, 1954	1988–1991
Robert L. Hause III	Epsilon chapter, 1955	1991–1994
Richard A. Crosby	Eta-Omicron chapter, 1975	1994–1997
Terry Blair	Beta Mu chapter, 1979	1997–2000
Darhyl S. Ramsey	Lambda Omega chapter, 1967	2000–2003
Richard A. Crosby	Eta-Omicron chapter, 1975	2003–2009
John A. Mongiovi	Upsilon Psi chapter, 1994	2009–2015
Mark R. Lichtenberg	Delta Nu chapter, 1993	2015–2022
Kyle C. Coleman	Zeta Iota chapter, 1998	2022–2025
Jonathan "Rusty" Shields	Omicron Omega chapter, 2003	2025–present

=== Other national officers ===
The corporate officers of the fraternity, in addition to the National President and National Vice President, are the National Secretary-Treasurer and the National Historian. The National Secretary-Treasurer is designated by the NEC from among its members. The NEC may also designate an Assistant Secretary-Treasurer from among its members or among the members of the national staff who is empowered to fulfill all of the duties of the National Secretary-Treasurer. The National Historian is appointed by the National President, subject to ratification by the NEC.

=== National Council ===
As established by the fraternity's first national constitution, the highest governing body within the fraternity was known as the Supreme Governing Council, the members of which were the supreme (national) officers and one supreme councilman from each chapter, usually its president. This was the body that conducted business at each national convention, and it could also conduct business by mail ballot between conventions if necessary. The fraternity moved to the present National Assembly format with delegates being the members of the NEC, the PGs, and one collegiate member from each province (now the CPR) in 1964 at the same time that it moved from biennial to triennial conventions. The National Council, as a governing body, was retained, but only for actions required between conventions that are outside the jurisdiction of the National Executive Committee (e.g., amending the National Constitution). The National Council currently consists of the members of the NEC, the PGs, and the president or his designee of each collegiate chapter.

=== Regional units ===
From 1922 to 1948, chapters of Phi Mu Alpha were grouped into regional units called districts that were assigned geographically descriptive names such as "Southern District" and "Northeastern District." Starting in 1949, the districts were replaced by provinces, each of which was given a numerical designation. Since that time, new provinces have been formed by the merging and splitting of former provinces, with province numbers being issued in chronological order. There are currently 38 active provinces, yet the highest-numbered province is Province 40. Province 31, which is made up of the states of Wyoming and Utah, has no active collegiate chapters or alumni associations and is therefore considered inactive. Province 10 was vacated in 1990, and its remaining chapter was assigned to Province 7 so that there no longer exists a geographical region with the designation "Province 10". No chapter has ever been established in the states of Vermont, New Hampshire, Maine, Rhode Island, Alaska, and Hawaii.

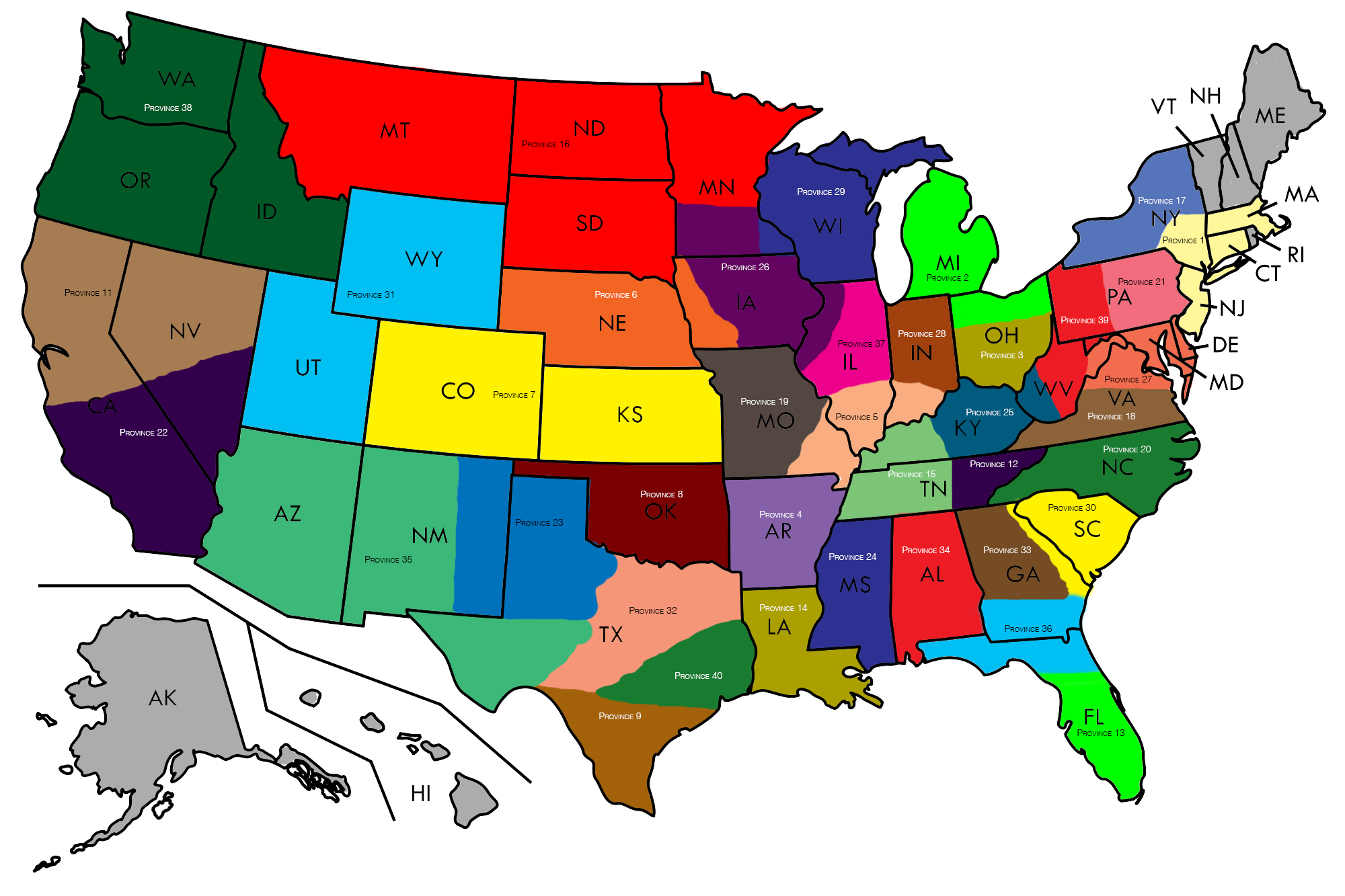
Rough Outline of Provinces

Each province is led by a Province Governor (PG) who is appointed by the National President and approved by the National Executive Committee. The PG acts as the representative of the National President in all matters about activities of the collegiate chapters, colonies, and alumni associations in his province. At his discretion, the National President may also appoint a Deputy Province Governor (DPG) for a province.

Each PG is responsible for organizing an annual Province Workshop for the collegiate chapters, colonies, and alumni associations in the province. The Province Workshop usually includes chapter officer training sessions; cooperative province projects; discussion of matters of national, provincial, and local concern; interaction and communication between chapters; and consideration of other business matters. Insofar as the collective chapters present at the Province Workshop can pass resolutions and conduct other business, the Province Workshop is a form of convention, and each chapter in good standing within the province is entitled to five voting delegates. Colonies and alumni associations do not have voting rights at the Province Workshop.

The only item of business that must be transacted by the voting delegates at each Province Workshop is the election of collegiate members to the offices of Collegiate Province Representative (CPR) and Assistant Collegiate Province Representative (ACPR). The CPR and ACPR serve as representatives of the collegiate membership of their province to the national organization and provide support to the chapters in their province.

A province may choose to establish a province council, which at a minimum would consist of the PG, the CPR, and equal representation from each collegiate chapter in the province. A province council could also include other province officers and representation from any alumni associations in the province. Province councils organize themselves to plan activities and make decisions affecting the welfare of the province, membership education within each chapter, and chapter and alumni association interaction

=== Province governors' and collegiate province representatives' councils ===
The PGs and the CPRs organize themselves into respective councils to advise the NEC on the operations of the fraternity and facilitate communication among themselves. Each council elects a chairman and a secretary during caucus meetings at each national convention. The chairman of each council serves as a member of the NEC, and the secretary assumes the chairmanship should it become vacant. The chairmen and the secretaries of the CPRs' and PGs' Councils hold their positions until the next national convention, even if they cease to be a Province Governor or Collegiate Province Representative.

The CPRs' Council meets from December 27–31 of each year, and the PGs' Council meets during the summer of each non-convention year. These meetings are referred to as convocations and are usually held at Lyrecrest. At the convocations, the chairmen conduct training sessions for the members of their respective councils, facilitate discussions about topics of concern regarding the fraternity, and chair business sessions to adopt formal resolutions recommending actions to the NEC. In convention years, members of the PG's Council arrive at the national convention site a day early for a brief meeting to prepare for their duties as members of the National Assembly, but a full convocation is not held.

=== Commission on Standards ===
The Commission on Standards (COS) is the only national standing committee required under Phi Mu Alpha's National Constitution. The COS has three primary areas of responsibility.

The COS is responsible for all aspects of the fraternity's Colony Program, including establishing the guidelines of the program, approving petitioning groups for colony status, and approving applications for chapter installation or reactivation that are submitted by colonies. For good cause, the COS may dissolve a colony at any time.

The COS also oversees the operational well-being of chapters and alumni associations. If a chapter or alumni association is not meeting certain standards, the COS may take corrective actions. Should such actions fail, the COS may place a chapter or alumni association on inactive status.

Additionally, the COS serves as the fraternity's national judiciary. It enforces national policies, especially the fraternity's Risk Management Policies, by conducting investigations into alleged violations and imposing disciplinary actions on individual members, chapters, or alumni associations as it deems appropriate. The COS may also discipline individual members, chapters, and alumni associations for general misconduct that is harmful to the best interests or good name of the fraternity. All disciplinary actions taken by the COS are appealable to the NEC.

Members of the COS are appointed for three-year terms by the National President, subject to ratification by the NEC. The COS must include in its membership at least one Province Governor and at least one collegiate member, though these statuses must only be held at the time of appointment and not for the entire term. A member of the NEC is also appointed to serve as a non-voting member of the COS.

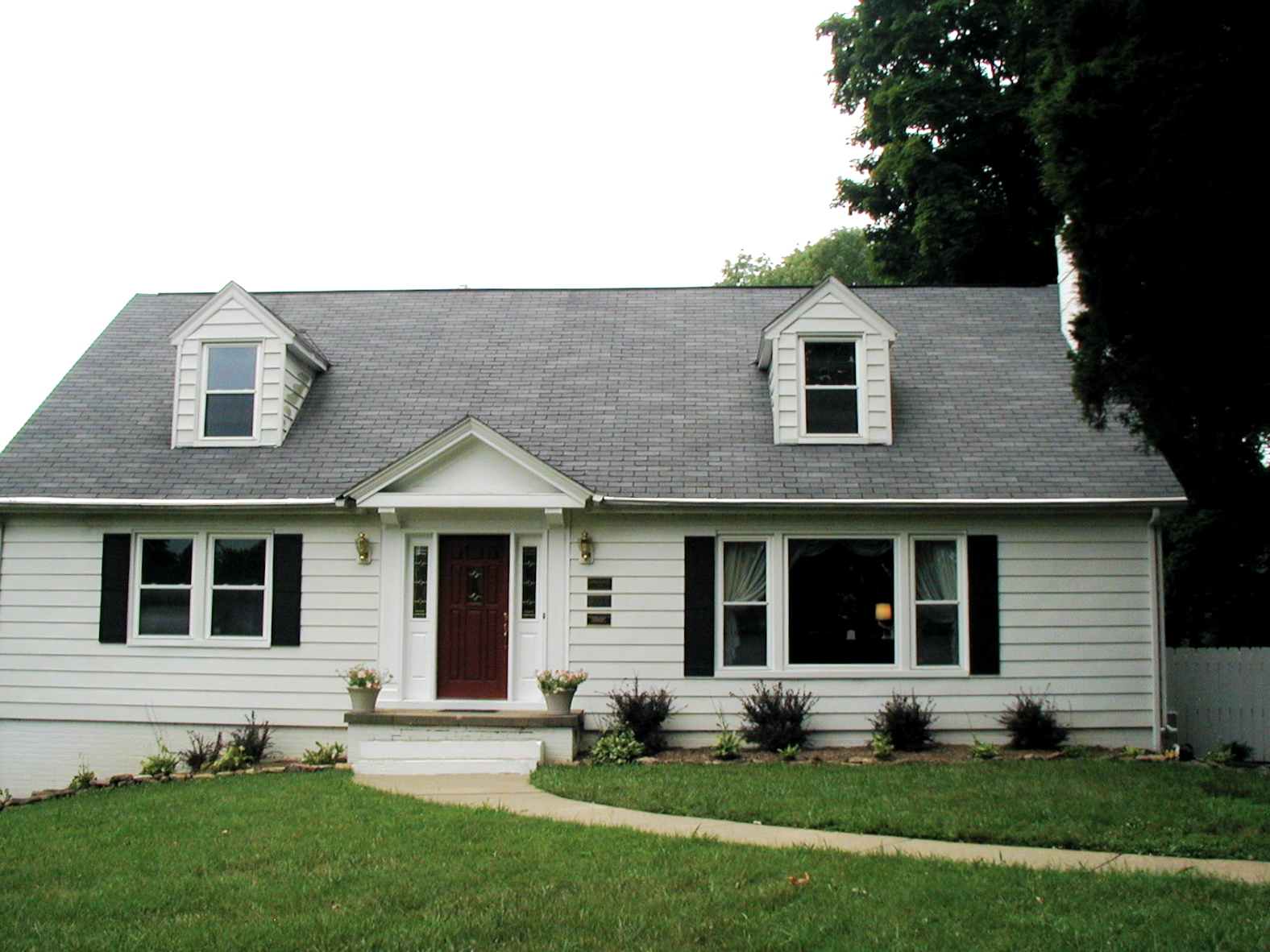
Lyrecrest (National Headquarters)

=== National headquarters and staff ===
Phi Mu Alpha is headquartered in a converted house located at 10600 Old State Road in Evansville, Indiana known as Lyrecrest. The headquarters contains the working offices of the fraternity's national staff, and an adjacent building known as Lyrecrest North contains the fraternity's national museum and archives. The national headquarters property also includes the Robert H. Bray Cottage, a lodge-style building with 24 beds used for housing for retreats and national committee meetings.

Executive Secretaries/Executive Directors of Phi Mu Alpha Sinfonia
Name	Initiating chapter and year	Term
Charles E. Lutton*	Iota, 1911	1919–1949
Price Doyle	Gamma Delta, 1938	1949–1967
Alan Adams	Theta Iota, 1961	1967–1978
Daniel Beeman	Upsilon Psi, 1969	1978–1983
Jylene Wright**	Lambda Kappa, 1983	1983–1984
Edward Klint	Alpha Xi, 1978	1985–1987
Kelley Alig	Kappa Tau, 1973	1987–1989
Barry Magee***	Alpha Upsilon, 1983	1989–1993
Jacky Howlett***	Gamma Delta, 1983	1989–1993
Gary Ingle	Pi Sigma, 1973	1994–1996
Jeffrey Spoeri‡	Nu Sigma, 1984	1996–1997
Bruce Clausen	Alpha Epsilon, 1967	July–October 1997
James P. Morris	Alpha iota, 1989	1998–2002
Ryan Ripperton	Alpha Rho, 1995	2002–2010
Jeremy Evans†	Delta Nu, 1998	2010–2012
Edward Klint	Alpha Xi, 1978	2013–2015‡, 2015–2023
Jared Ivory‡	Zeta Iota, 2001	2023–present

*Unpaid Executive Secretary **Director of Lyrecrest *** Co-Directors †Chief Operating Officer ‡Interim Executive Director

== See also ==
- List of social fraternities
