= Union Commonwealth University =

Private university in Barbourville, Kentucky, U.S.

Coordinates: 36.87028°N 83.88808°W

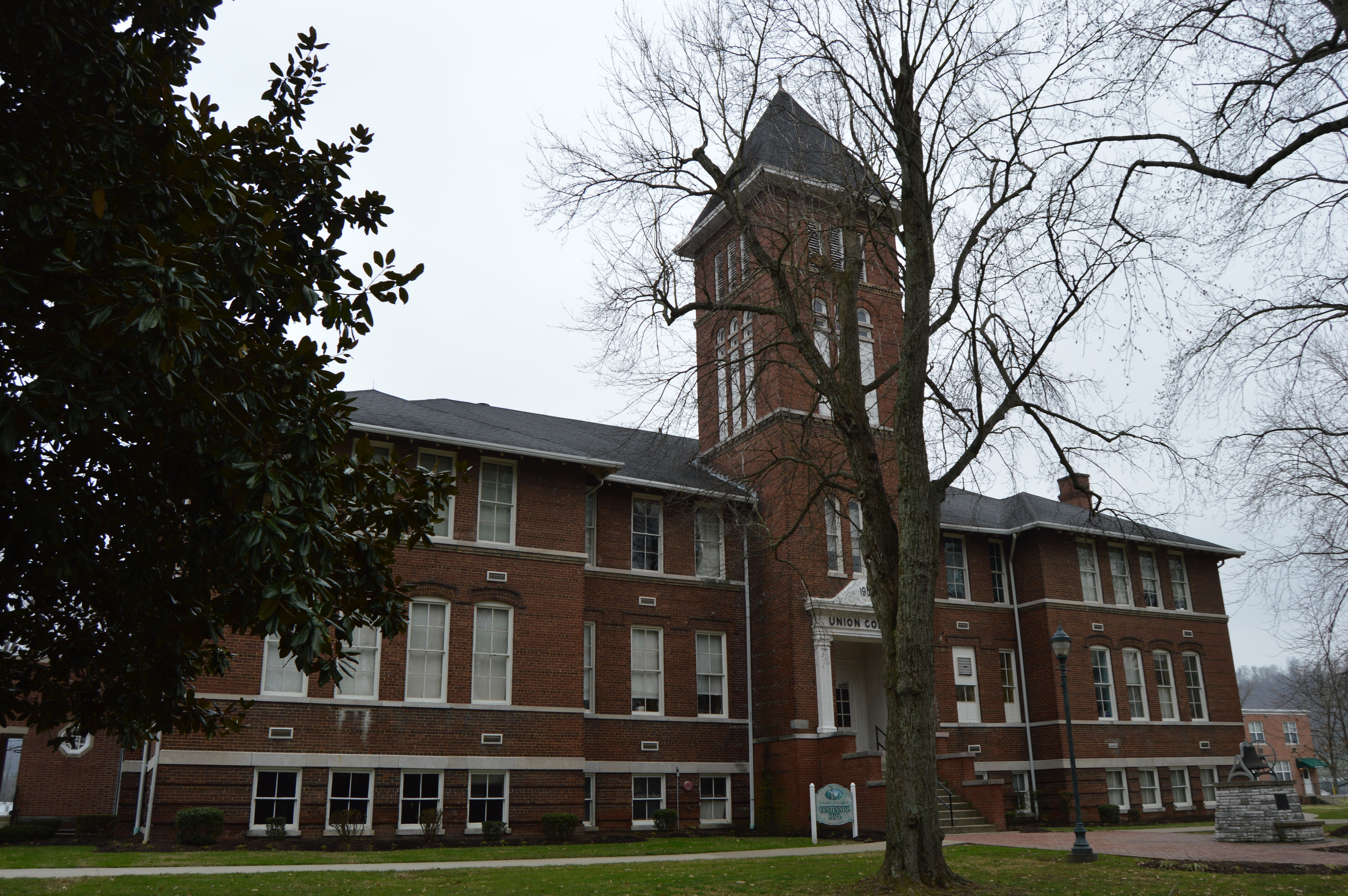
- Old Classroom Building
- Former name: Union College
- Motto: Pro Deo Et Homine
- Motto in English: For God and Mankind
- Type: Private university
- Established: 1879; 147 years ago
- Religious affiliation: United Methodist Church
- Academic affiliations: NAICU; CIC
- President: DJ Washington
- Students: 1,324 (fall 2024)
- Undergraduates: 775
- Postgraduates: 549
- Location: Barbourville, Kentucky, United States
- Colors: Orange & Black
- Nickname: Bulldogs
- Sporting affiliations: NAIA – Appalachian
- Website: unionky.edu
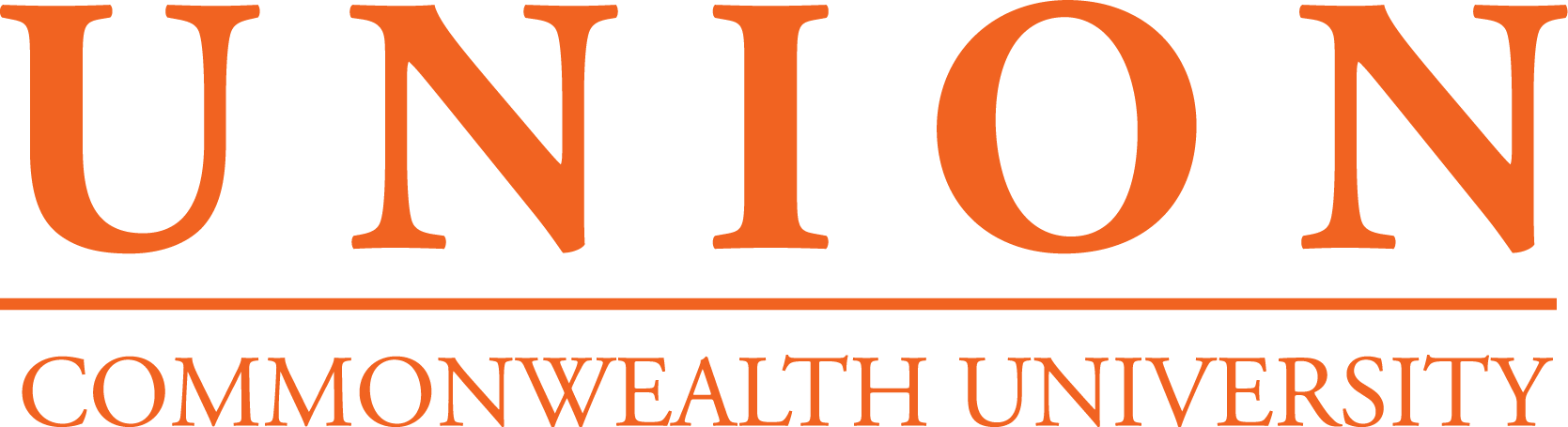

Union Commonwealth University (formerly Union College) is a private university in Barbourville, Kentucky. The university was founded in 1879 and is affiliated with the United Methodist Church. Union's 1,324 students represent 31 states and 33 countries.

Union's 100-acre (0.40 km^{2}) campus is in southeastern Kentucky. Approximately 30 percent of students live in three residence halls and apartments on campus.

== Academics ==
Union Commonwealth University offers the Bachelor of Arts and the Bachelor of Science degrees. The college also offers Master of Arts in Psychology and Education. Additionally, new programs at the Master's level include Master of Business Administration, Master of Science in Administration, and Master of Science in Athletic Administration.

The college operates on a two-semester calendar, with a May interim session and two summer terms. Students must successfully complete a total of 120 semester hours to earn a bachelor's degree, including 35 hours of required core classes from the four major divisions of study.

=== Study abroad ===
Union Commonwealth University is a cooperating member of the Kentucky Institute for International Studies (KIIS). The college joins with a number of other Kentucky colleges and universities to provide summer study opportunities in ten different locations. The programs in Argentina, France, Spain, Mexico, Germany, Austria, Italy and Ecuador are open to all Union College students, who may earn credits toward their degree at Union.

=== Rankings ===
The 2026 U.S. News & World Report Best Colleges Rankings listed Union Commonwealth University at 96th overall among all regional universities in the South.

== Campus ==
The campus includes more than 100 gently rolling acres covered in overhanging elms, mountain laurel, and Georgian architecture. The Wilderness Road spans the east side of the campus, and Cumberland Gap National Historical Park is approximately 30 miles (48 km) away. The campus is in the city of Barbourville, approximately 17 miles (27 km) east of Interstate 75 and surrounded by four state parks filled with falls, lakes, and streams.

=== Academic facilities ===
The Weeks-Townsend Memorial Library contains more than 160,000 books, periodicals, government documents, media materials and online reference and full-text databases. Library functions, including the public catalog access (OPAC), circulation and reserves are fully automated through the Sirsi Unicorn Collection Management System. The 20-seat computer lab is the center of campus access to the Internet, including email and the World Wide Web. The college also has a variety of computers accessible to students. The library and Centennial computer labs each contain 20 workstations and a laser printer connected to the campus network. A third lab, the Hensley lab, provides the same type of access with 17 computers. The labs are open a variety of hours each week to support the academic programs and provide student access to the campus network.

The Academic Resource Center (ARC) provides free services to Union Commonwealth University students in several academic support areas. Individual tutoring is available in a variety of subject areas in both upper and lower division classes. Students may work with a tutor to review for classes, refresh study skills, or prepare for professional examinations such as GMAT, LSAT, MCAT, GRE, and NTE. Each semester, courses that have been deemed academically challenging are selected for Supplemental Instruction (SI). Students attend group study sessions, which are held a minimum of three times a week with a student leader who has already excelled in that particular course. The SI leaders model good study strategies and encourage collaborative learning.

The Sharp Academic Center is one of the primary classroom facilities on campus. Named for alumnus and Nobel Laureate Phillip Allen Sharp, the Sharp Academic Center was added to a remodeled dormitory, providing classroom and office space. Currently, the offices include the Office of the President, the Office of the Academic Vice President, Student Support Services, the Department of Social and Behavioral Sciences, and the Department of History.

The Ramsey Center is an additional classroom and laboratory space on campus. Named for Kenneth and Sarah Ramsey, the center was remodeled from the former Knox County Hospital. This building houses the Department of Natural Sciences, the Psychology Department, and the Edna Jenkins Mann School of Nursing.

== Athletics ==
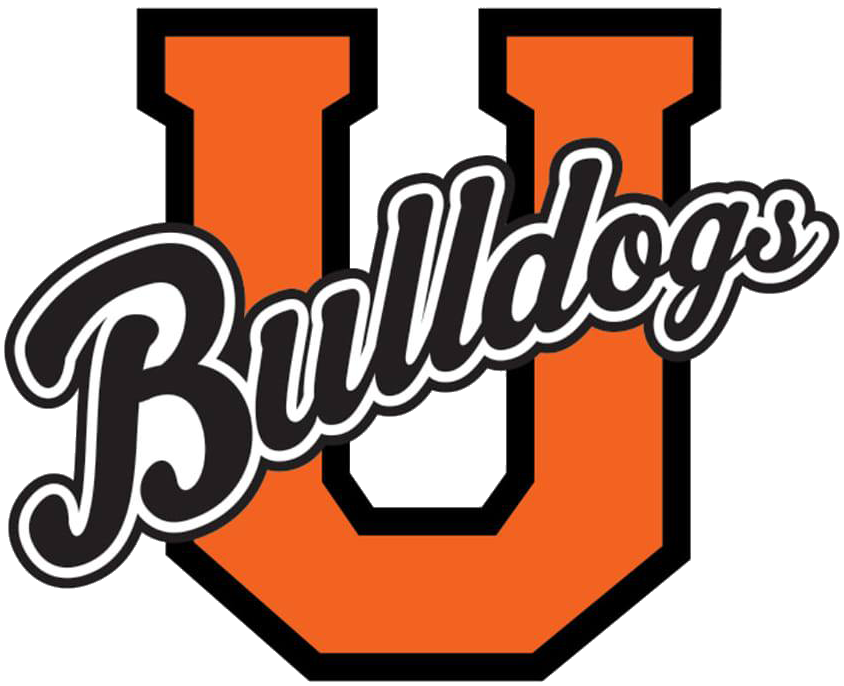
Union athletics logo

Union Commonwealth University's athletic teams are called the Bulldogs and Lady Bulldogs. The university is a member of the National Association of Intercollegiate Athletics (NAIA), primarily competing in the Appalachian Athletic Conference (AAC) for most of its sports since the 2002–03 academic year; while its men's & women's bowling and archery teams compete in the Mid-South Conference (MSC), which they previously competed as a full member from 1995–96 to 2001–02.

Union Commonwealth competes in 22 intercollegiate varsity sports: Men's sports include baseball, basketball, bowling, cross country, football, golf, soccer, swimming & diving, tennis, and track & field; while women's sports include basketball, bowling, cross country, golf, soccer, softball, swimming & diving, tennis, track & field and volleyball; and co-ed sports include archery and cheerleading. Former sports included men's lacrosse, co-ed cycling, and co-ed dance. Intramural sports vary according to student request. The university recently completed new tennis courts and a softball field and refurbished the baseball, soccer, and football fields.

=== Accomplishments ===
Union Commonwealth University men's basketball also recently won their first NAIA Division II national title in the 2016–17 season. This marked the schools third team national championship, the first two were earned by the cycling team in 2002 and 2012.

== Notable alumni ==
- G. Lindsey Davis, Bishop of the United Methodist Church
- Flem D. Sampson, the 42nd Governor of Kentucky
- Phillip Allen Sharp, co-recipient of the 1993 Nobel Prize for Medicine for work that altered scientists' understanding of the structure of genes, received his undergraduate degree at Union College.
- Derek Smith, former professional soccer player
- William A. Stanfill, member of the United States Senate from Kentucky
- Armond Smith, former NFL running back
