= Kiss FM 958 Corfu (Greece) =

KIISFM EXTRA (Greece)
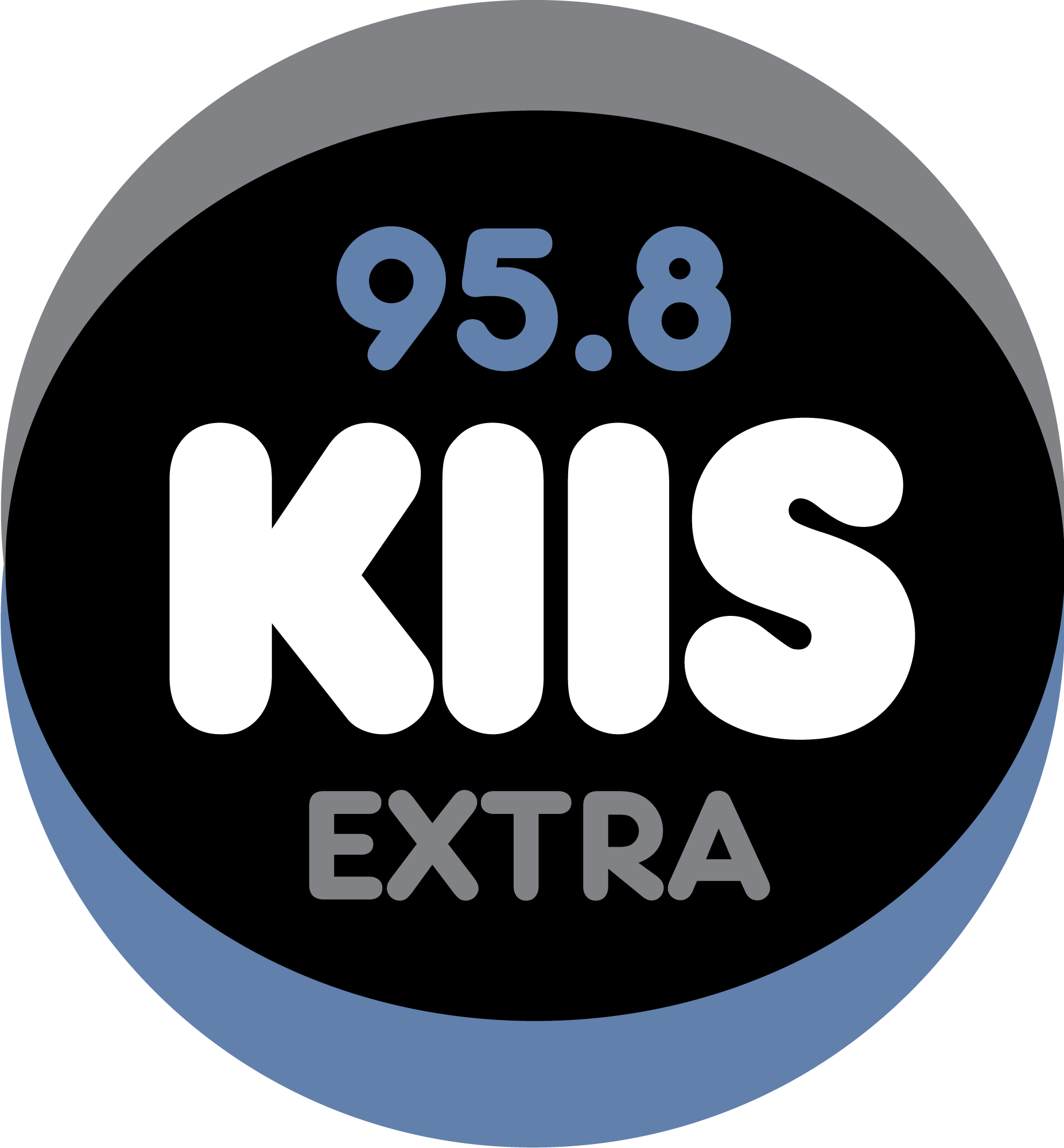
- Greece; Greece
- Broadcast area: Ionian Islands & Western Greece
- Frequency: 95.8 MHz
- Branding: KIISFM Extra, serving the Ionian Islands and West Greece

Programming
- Language: Greek
- Format: Pop music
- Affiliations: KIIS Extra 92.2 Patras

Ownership
- Owner: Anastasios Mexas

History
- First air date: 1994 (TOP FM 95.8); November 25, 1997 (NRG); January 22, 2014 (KISS 95.8); January 8, 2016 (KIIS EXTRA)
- Former call signs: TOP FM 95.8 (1994–1997); ENERGY Corfu (1997–2013); KISS 95,8 Corfu (2013–2016)
- Former frequencies: 95.7 MHz (2006–2013)
- Call sign meaning: KIIS Extra FM 95.8

Links
- Webcast: kiis958.gr/player/
- Website: kiis958.gr

KIISFM Extra is a radio station broadcasting on 95.8 MHz Stereo based in Corfu, Greece. It serves Corfu, the Ionian Islands, Epirus and the Western portion of Greece. The station's programming consists of a mix of 1980s music and contemporary hits.

Anastasios Mexas is the program director from January 2014 and the owner of this station from November 2017.

== History ==
The station launched in 1994 as TOP FM Corfu. On 25 November 1997, it was relaunched as Energy (NRG) Corfu. On 8 January 2016, the station was rebranded as KIISFM Extra.
