= List of University of Colorado Boulder alumni =

List of some notable people associated with the University of Colorado Boulder

Coordinates: 40.0087°N 105.2728°W

Location of the University of Colorado Boulder in Colorado

The following is a list of some notable alumni of the University of Colorado Boulder.

== Nobel laureate alumni ==
- Ellen Johnson Sirleaf, co-recipient of the Nobel Peace Prize, 2011, BA

== Notable alumni ==
=== Academia, science and technology ===
- Len Ackland, professor at the University of Colorado and co-director of the Center for Environmental Journalism
- Elaine Anderson, paleontologist
- George J. Armelagos, Goodrich C. White Professor of Anthropology at Emory University
- John Christian Bailar, statistician, professor emeritus at the University of Chicago
- Janet Bonnema, civil engineer
- Kathryn Bullock, electrochemist
- Mark Busby, professor of English at Texas State University
- Steve Chappell, aerospace engineer and NASA scientist
- Erica Chenoweth, Frank Stanton Professor of the First Amendment at the Harvard Kennedy School
- Robert Corruccini, biological anthropologist and author of numerous monographs and articles on the theory of malocclusion
- Hilda Counts, electrical engineer
- Patrick Curran, professor of quantitative psychology at the University of North Carolina and Director of the L. L. Thurstone Psychometric Laboratory
- Ward Darley, president, University of Colorado
- William E. Davis, former university president and United States Senate candidate
- Vine Deloria Jr., academic and political author on Native American subjects
- W. Edwards Deming, manufacturing quality expert
- Marla Dowell, physicist, director of NIST Communications Technology Laboratory
- Patricia Louise Dudley, zoologist specializing in copepods
- Elsie Eaves, civil engineer
- Donald Evenson, biologist and chemist
- Kristian Skrede Gleditsch, Regius Professor of political science at the University of Essex, and former president of the International Studies Association (2021–22)
- Grizelle González, ecologist at the Sabana Field Research Station
- Steve H. Hanke, professor of economics at Johns Hopkins University, adviser to presidents, currency reformer and commodity and currency trader
- David Haussler, professor, University of California, Santa Cruz
- Clayton Heathcock, professor of Chemistry and dean of the College of Chemistry at the University of California, Berkeley
- Gretchen Hofmann, professor of ecological physiology of marine organisms at the University of California, Santa Barbara
- Tom Hornbein, developed the standard breathing mask after climbing Mt. Everest in 1963
- Charles Hoskinson, mathematician, founder of Cardano and co-founder of Ethereum
- Moriba Jah, astrodynamicist; associate professor of aerospace engineering and engineering mechanics at the University of Texas at Austin; Core Faculty of the Institute for Computational Engineering and Sciences; former spacecraft navigator for NASA's Jet Propulsion Laboratory
- Alan Kay, computer scientist, Turing Award winner
- Caitlín R. Kiernan, paleontologist and award-winning science-fiction author, specializing in Cretaceous mosasaurs and turtles; two-time winner of the World Fantasy Award
- Elisabeth Kubler-Ross, Swiss-born psychiatrist and the author of the groundbreaking book On Death and Dying
- Ron Larson, professor of mathematics at Penn State Erie, The Behrend College
- Emory Lindquist, Rhodes scholar, Swedish American historian, president of Bethany College and Wichita State University
- Theodore Harold Maiman, demonstrated the first laser
- Tom Maniatis, Edelma Professor of Biochemistry and Molecular Biophysics at the Columbia University College of Physicians and Surgeons
- Christopher McKay, planetary scientist at NASA Ames Research Center
- Lou Alta Melton, civil engineer and bridge engineer
- Kenneth Miller, biologist at Brown University
- Kathe Perez, speech-language pathologist
- Ralph Prator, first president of California State University, Northridge
- Kay Schallenkamp, president of Emporia State University, and later Black Hills State University
- Leon Silver, geologist at California Institute of Technology, past president of Geological Society of America, trained Apollo astronauts in field geology
- Christopher Sorensen, Cortelyou-Rust University Distinguished Professor and a University Distinguished Teaching Scholar in the Kansas State University Physics Department
- Gary Stormo, geneticist and pioneer of bioinformatics and genomics
- Michael T. Voorhees, entrepreneur, engineer, designer, geographer, and aeronaut

=== The arts, including film ===
(see separate sections further down for "literature" and "journalism")

- 3OH!3, electronic music group
- Linda Alterwitz, artist and photographer
- Josephine Antoine, coloratura soprano with the Metropolitan Opera
- Brandon Barnes, drummer for the band Rise Against and Pinhead Circus
- Charles L. Bestor, composer and music educator
- Big Head Todd and the Monsters, platinum selling recording artists
- Austin Bisnow, songwriter, producer, and lead singer of the band MAGIC GIANT
- Rodney Carswell, painter
- Chairlift, electronic-pop group
- Derek Cianfrance, screenwriter and film director
- Lydia Cornell, actress, author
- Eli Craig, screenwriter and film director
- Eric Darnell, director
- Joey Diaz, comedian
- Brian Dietzen, actor
- Lisa Donovan, actress and writer
- Patricia Elliott, actress
- Joe Flanigan, actor
- Tanner Foust, television host, stunt driver, professional racing driver
- Nicole Fox, model, winner of America's Next Top Model, Cycle 13
- Drew Goddard, film and television screenwriter, director and producer
- Jake Goldberg, actor
- Keith Dale Gordon, theatrical lyricist and composer
- Dave Grusin, composer, winner of three Academy Awards and three Grammy Awards
- Heather Hach, wrote the screenplay for the 2003 remake of Freaky Friday and the book of the Broadway musical Legally Blonde
- Erinn Hayes, actress
- Jonah Hill, actor, withdrew after freshman year
- David "GrandPooBear" Hunt, speedrunner and streamer well known for retro Super Mario games
- Angus T. Jones, actor
- R. J. Kern, artist and photographer
- Shawn King, drummer, percussionist, trumpeter, accordionist, organist for the band DeVotchKa
- Chaney Kley, actor
- Land of the Loops, electronica musician
- William Lewis, opera tenor and academic
- Larry Linville, actor (M*A*S*H)
- Low vs Diamond, rock band
- Erin Macdonald, science consultant for Star Trek
- Ross Marquand, actor
- Christopher Meloni, actor
- Glenn Miller, composer, big band leader
- Joan Moment, painter and educator
- Nathaniel Motte, singer, songwriter, producer, performer, film composer, instrumentalist, and playwright
- Thomas Noel, historian
- Peter O'Fallon, director, producer and writer
- Trey Parker, Emmy and Tony Award–winning director, writer, and producer; co-creator of South Park
- Caroline Polachek, singer-songwriter
- Robert Redford, actor (did not graduate), Oscar winner, founder of the Sundance Film Festival
- Dean Reed, actor, singer and songwriter, director, and social activist
- Joe Safdie, poet
- Beryl Shereshewsky, YouTuber, filmmaker, video producer, and host of PBS' Pan Pals
- Aaron Simpson, Emmy-nominated animation producer
- Susan Arnout Smith, award-winning playwright and novelist
- Derek Vincent Smith, electronic music producer, withdrew after freshman year
- Paul Soldner, artist
- Matt Stone, Emmy, and Tony Award–winning director, writer, and producer; co-creator of South Park
- Eric Stough, producer and director of animation on South Park
- Steve Taylor, singer/songwriter and film director
- Dalton Trumbo, writer, Academy Award winner
- Joan Van Ark, actress
- Townes Van Zandt, country-folk singer-songwriter, withdrew in his sophomore year
- Linda Williams, professor of film studies at the University of California, Berkeley
- Chris Wood, electronic musician
- Pamela Z, composer, performer, and media artist
- Dean Zanuck, motion picture executive and producer

=== Astronauts ===
- Loren Acton, NASA astronaut
- Patrick Baudry, CNES astronaut
- Vance D. Brand, NASA astronaut
- Scott Carpenter, NASA astronaut in second orbital flight (fourth crewed) of Project Mercury
- Kalpana Chawla, NASA astronaut, died on Columbia
- Takao Doi, NASA astronaut
- Samuel T. Durrance, NASA astronaut
- John Herrington, NASA astronaut
- Richard Hieb, NASA astronaut
- Marsha Ivins, NASA astronaut
- John M. Lounge, NASA astronaut
- George Nelson, NASA astronaut
- Ellison Onizuka, NASA astronaut, died on Challenger in January 1986
- Stuart Roosa, NASA astronaut, flew on Apollo 14
- Ronald M. Sega, NASA astronaut
- Steven Swanson, NASA astronaut
- Jack Swigert, NASA astronaut, flew on Apollo 13
- James Voss, NASA astronaut

=== Athletics ===
==== A–F ====
- Bobby Anderson, former NFL running back for the Denver Broncos
- Dick Anderson, former NFL safety for the Miami Dolphins
- Tom Ashworth, former NFL offensive tackle
- Sal Aunese, Big Eight Newcomer of the Year
- Chidobe Awuzie, NFL cornerback for the Baltimore Ravens
- David Bakhtiari, former NFL offensive tackle for the Green Bay Packers
- Justin Bannan, former NFL defensive tackle
- Dede Barry, cyclist, won silver in the 2004 Summer Olympics in the women's time trial
- Mitch Berger, former NFL punter
- Greg Biekert, American football coach and former NFL linebacker for the Oakland Raiders and Minnesota Vikings
- Eric Bieniemy, former NFL running back and offensive coordinator for the Kansas City Chiefs
- Chauncey Billups, American basketball coach and former NBA point guard, 2004 NBA Finals MVP
- Abhinav Bindra, shooter, won gold for India in the 2008 Summer Olympics in the 10 metre air rifle
- Joan Birkland, Colorado state women's amateur golf and tennis champion
- Jeremy Bloom, world champion and two-time Olympic freestyle skier; former NFL wide receiver and return specialist, for the Philadelphia Eagles
- Magnus Bøe, cross-country skier, Olympian, 2018
- Cliff Branch, former wide receiver with the Oakland Raiders
- Tyler Brayton, former NFL defensive end
- Carlon Brown, former professional basketball player, 2013–14 top scorer in the Israel Basketball Premier League
- Chris Brown, former NFL running back
- Heidi Browning, NHL chief marketing officer
- Rae Carruth, former wide receiver for the Carolina Panthers
- Franklin Clarke, former All-Pro wide receiver for the Dallas Cowboys
- Emma Coburn, mid-distance runner, Olympian 2016 bronze medalist in the steeplechase, 2017 World Champion
- Valerie Constien, 3000m and 3000m steeplechase, Olympian, 2020 and 2024
- Mark Cooney, former NFL linebacker for the Green Bay Packers
- Joe Cooper, former NBA center
- Mason Crosby, former NFL kicker for the Green Bay Packers
- Alan Culpepper, runner, Olympian, 2000 and 2004
- Tristan da Silva, NBA small forward for the Orlando Magic
- Koy Detmer, former NFL quarterback
- Spencer Dinwiddie, former NBA guard
- Boyd Dowler, former NFL wide receiver for the Green Bay Packers
- Flora Duffy, professional triathlete, Olympian 2020 gold medalist in triathlon, multiple-time World Champion
- Jon Embree, former head football coach for the Colorado Buffaloes
- Christian Fauria, former NFL tight end
- Bill Frank, Canadian Football Hall of Fame offensive lineman for the Toronto Argonauts and the Winnipeg Blue Bombers

==== G–M ====
- Tom Garfinkel, president and chief executive officer of the Miami Dolphins
- David Gibbs, former NFL head coach
- Taylor Gold (born 1993), snowboarder; Olympic bronze medalist
- Adam Goucher, professional runner, Olympian 2000
- Kara Goucher, professional runner, Olympian 2008, 2012
- Daniel Graham, former NFL tight end
- BJ Green II, NFL defensive end for the Jacksonville Jaguars
- Natalia Grossman, IFSC Climbing World Cup champion sport climber
- Alex Gurney, professional auto racing driver
- Andre Gurode, American football coach and former All-Pro center for the Dallas Cowboys
- D.J. Hackett, former NFL wide receiver
- Tyler Hamilton, cyclist with many impressive finishes at the Tour de France and the Summer Olympics
- David Harrison, former NBA center
- Don Hasselbeck, former NFL tight end
- Steven J. Hatchell, president and chief executive officer of the National Football Foundation and College Football Hall of Fame
- Mark Haynes, former NFL cornerback
- Jimmie Heuga, alpine skiing, 1964 Olympic bronze medalist in slalom
- Katie Hnida, football placekicker (graduated from the University of New Mexico)
- Jimmy Horn Jr., NFL wide receiver for the Carolina Panthers
- Jay Howell, retired Major League Baseball pitcher of 15 years
- Jay Humphries, former NBA guard
- Travis Hunter, 2024 Heisman Trophy winner; NFL cornerback and wide receiver for the Jacksonville Jaguars
- Hale Irwin, golfer, three-time U.S. Open champion and member of the World Golf Hall of Fame
- Brian Iwuh, former NFL linebacker for the Jacksonville Jaguars
- Jonathan Kaye (born 1970), professional golfer who played on the PGA Tour
- Billy Kidd, alpine skiing, 1964 Olympic silver medalist in slalom, 1970 World Champion (combined)
- Joe Klopfenstein, former NFL tight end
- Taylor Kornieck, NWSL midfielder for Racing Louisville FC
- Stuart Krohn (born 1962), former professional rugby union player
- Sepp Kuss, cyclist, winner of the 2023 Vuelta a España
- Nate Landman, NFL linebacker for the Los Angeles Rams
- Matt Lepsis, former NFL offensive tackle for the Denver Broncos
- Michael Lewis, former All-Pro safety for the San Francisco 49ers
- Phillip Lindsay, former NFL running back
- Dave Logan, former NFL receiver, broadcaster
- Eliot Marshall, retired mixed martial arts fighter
- Nikki Marshall, former NWSL defender
- Scotty McKnight, former NFL wide receiver for the New York Jets
- Matt Miller, former NFL offensive tackle for the Cleveland Browns

==== N–Z ====
- William Nelson, professional runner, Olympian 2008; assistant coach and recruiting coordinator for the CU XC/Track & Field Teams
- Jordan Nytes, NWSL goalkeeper for the Denver Summit FC
- Isaiah Oliver, NFL cornerback for the Arizona Cardinals
- Morgan Pearson, professional triathlete, Olympian 2020 and 2024 silver medalist in the mixed relay triathlon
- Tyler Polumbus, former NFL offensive tackle
- Vince Rafferty, former NFL center and guard for the Green Bay Packers
- Marcus Relphorde (born 1988), basketball player in the France National League
- Paul Richardson, former NFL wide receiver
- Dathan Ritzenhein, head coach of the On Athletics Club and former professional runner, Olympian 2004, 2008, and 2012
- Paul Robinson, professional rock climber
- Bill Roe, former NFL and USFL linebacker
- Brady Russell, NFL fullback for the Seattle Seahawks
- Spider Sabich, alpine skiing, 1968 Olympian (5th in slalom), and pro champion, 1971 and 1972
- Rashaan Salaam, former NFL running back, 1994 Heisman Trophy winner
- Shedeur Sanders, NFL quarterback for the Cleveland Browns
- Cory Sandhagen, mixed martial artist who is competes in the bantamweight division of the Ultimate Fighting Championship
- Ryder Sarchett, American alpine ski racer specializing in giant slalom, Olympian in 2026
- Brendan Schaub, former NFL candidate; retired mixed martial artist for the Ultimate Fighting Championship; stand-up comedian
- Laviska Shenault, NFL wide receiver for the Jacksonville Jaguars
- Jaylyn Sherrod, WNBA point guard for the Atlanta Dream
- Cam'Ron Silmon-Craig, NFL safety for the Jacksonville Jaguars
- Jenny Simpson, 1500-meter runner, Olympian 2008, 2012, 2016 bronze medalist
- KJ Simpson, NBA point guard for the Denver Nuggets
- Jimmy Smith, former NFL cornerback for the Baltimore Ravens
- Nate Solder, former NFL offensive tackle
- John Stearns, former MLB catcher
- Alexandra Stevenson, former professional tennis player
- Kordell Stewart, former NFL quarterback for the Pittsburgh Steelers
- Bill Symons, former CFL All-Star for the Toronto Argonauts
- Debi Thomas, Olympic figure skater in 1988
- Tedric Thompson, former NFL safety
- Bill Toomey, Olympic gold medalist in the 1968 decathlon
- Rachel Wacholder, former professional beach volleyball player
- Ward Walsh, former NFL running back
- Xavier Weaver, NFL wide receiver for the Arizona Cardinals
- Scott Wedman, former NBA forward
- Michael Westbrook, former NFL wide receiver
- Terrence Wheatley, former NFL cornerback, first-team All-Big 12
- Damen Wheeler, former NFL and XFL cornerback
- Derrick White, NBA guard for the Boston Celtics, 2024 NBA Champion, 2024 Olympic gold medalist
- Alfred Williams, former NFL linebacker, 1990 Butkus Award winner
- Cody Williams, NBA small forward for the Utah Jazz
- Ahkello Witherspoon, NFL cornerback for the Washington Commanders
- John Wooten, All-American; former NFL guard; former vice president and director for the Philadelphia Eagles; assistant director for the Baltimore Ravens

=== Business and economy ===
- Mohamed Al-Mady, president of SABIC
- Jake Burton Carpenter, founder of Burton Snowboards
- John Dendahl, retired business executive and member of the 1960 US Olympic ski team
- Steve Ells, founder, chairman, and CEO of Chipotle Mexican Grill
- Thorleif Enger, former boss of Yara International; indicted in 2012 in relation to the company's business practices in Libya
- Richard S. Fuld, former Lehman Brothers chairman and CEO
- Tim Gill, founder and former chairman of Quark, Inc.
- Ron Gordon, former president of Atari
- Brent Handler, entrepreneur and pioneer of the destination club industry
- Michael Karlan, founder of the nation's largest social and networking group, Professionals in the City
- David Kennedy, co-founder of Wieden + Kennedy advertising agency, known for its 1980s "Just Do It" campaign for Nike
- Matt Larson, founder and CEO of Confio Software
- Sanford McDonnell, president of McDonnell Aircraft Corporation
- Chris Myers, former vice president of Business Development at Lockheed Martin and former mayor of Medford, New Jersey
- Scott Oki, former senior vice president of sales and marketing for Microsoft who conceived and built Microsoft's international operations
- Alexander Oshmyansky, co-founder, CEO of Mark Cuban Cost Plus Drug Company
- Lucy Sanders, CEO and co-founder of the National Center for Women & Information Technology
- Keith Villa, founder and brewmaster of Blue Moon Brewing Company and Ceria Brewing Company
- Steuart Walton, attorney and grandson of Sam Walton

=== Journalism ===
- John Branch, sports writer for The New York Times and recipient of the 2013 Pulitzer Prize for Feature Writing
- Dave Briggs, co-host of Fox & Friends Weekend, Fox News Channel
- Benedict Carey, medical and science writer for The New York Times
- Dan Carlin, television/radio journalist and podcaster
- Linda Chavez, political analyst and Fox News commentator
- Kevin Corke, White House correspondent, Fox News
- Tom Costello, NBC News, Washington-based correspondent
- Chris Fowler, ESPN
- Jim Gray, sports reporter
- Tom Keene, editor-at-large for Bloomberg News
- Herb Keinon, columnist and journalist for The Jerusalem Post
- Joe Kernen, CNBC anchor
- Zachery Kouwe, former financial journalist
- Taylor Lorenz, technology journalist
- Robert Palmer, Emmy Award winner, news editor and executive editor
- Carl Quintanilla, CNBC anchor
- Lara Jo Regan, documentary and fine-art photographer, photojournalist, author, winner of World Press Photo of the Year
- Rick Reilly, ESPN commentator and former Sports Illustrated writer, ten-time National Sportswriter of the Year
- Jonathan Weil, columnist for Bloomberg News and former writer for The Wall Street Journal

=== Law ===
- Christine Arguello (born 1955), senior judge of the U.S. District Court for the District of Colorado
- Roger S. Burdick, chief justice of the Idaho Supreme Court
- Howard Jenkins Jr., labor lawyer and civil servant
- Louis O. Kelso, corporate lawyer; inventor of the employee stock ownership plan (ESOP)
- William Lee Knous, former associate justice of the Colorado Supreme Court
- Ashby Pate, associate justice of the Supreme Court of Palau
- Wiley Rutledge, former associate justice of the U.S. Supreme Court
- John Suthers, former Attorney General of Colorado
- Bethuel M. Webster, lawyer and founder of Webster & Sheffield
- Byron White, former associate justice of the U.S. Supreme Court

=== Literature ===
- Molly Bloom, author
- Lynne Cheney, wife of former U.S. Vice President Dick Cheney; author of children's books
- Ed Dorn, poet
- John Fante, author of Ask the Dust
- Mark Leyner, author
- Stanley Mullen, short story writer, novelist and publisher
- Jean Stafford, Pulitzer Prize winner for The Collected Stories of Jean Stafford
- Luís Alberto Urrea, Mexican-American poet, novelist, and essayist
- Carrie Vaughn, author
- Vanessa Angélica Villarreal, poet
- Jack Williamson PhD, science fiction author and educator

=== Military ===
- Ben Connable, retired Marine major, professor at the Frederick S. Pardee RAND Graduate School
- Roger A. Lalich, retired U.S. National Guard brigadier general
- Harold R. Vague, Air Force major general and Judge Advocate General of the United States Air Force
- David D. Barrett, Army colonel, representative of the Dixie Mission in China, and professor at the University of Colorado

=== Politics ===
- Mahnaz Afkhami (born 1941), Iranian-American politician and human rights and women's rights activist, served in the Cabinet of Iran (1976–78)
- Joe Neguse, U.S. representative for Colorado

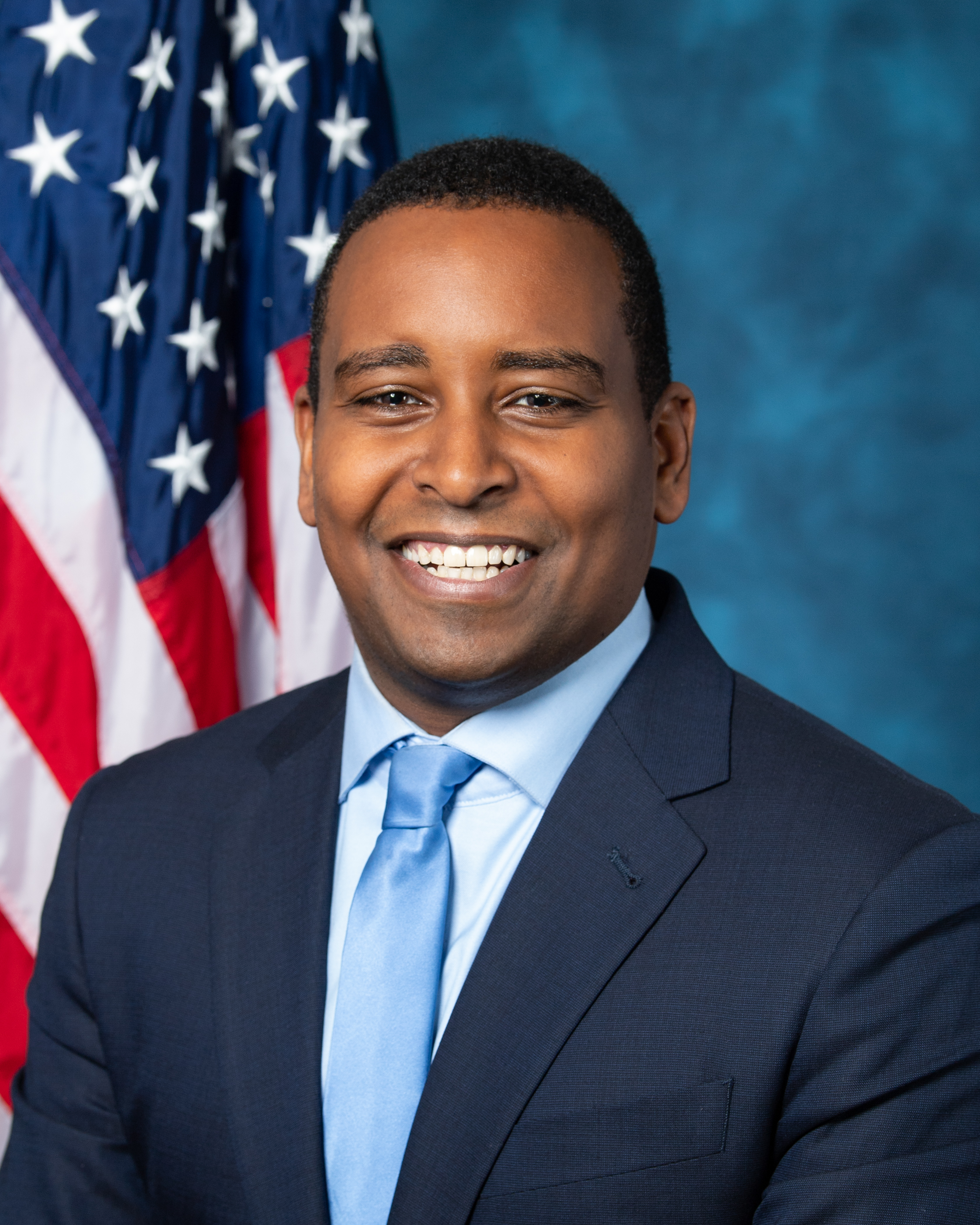
Congressman Joe Neguse

- Gordon L. Allott, former U.S. senator from Colorado (1955–1973)

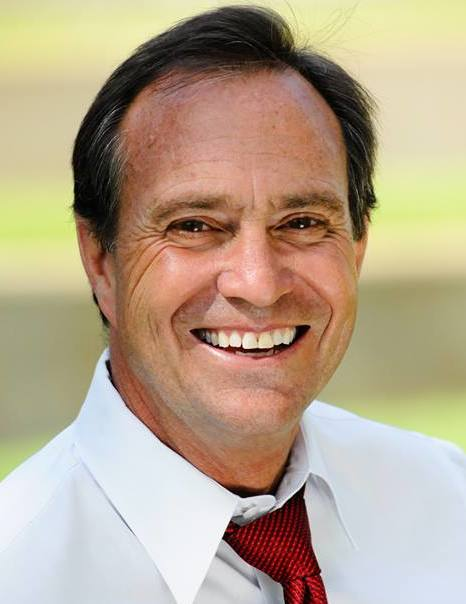
Former Congressman Ed Perlmutter

- Bob Beauprez, former U.S. representative

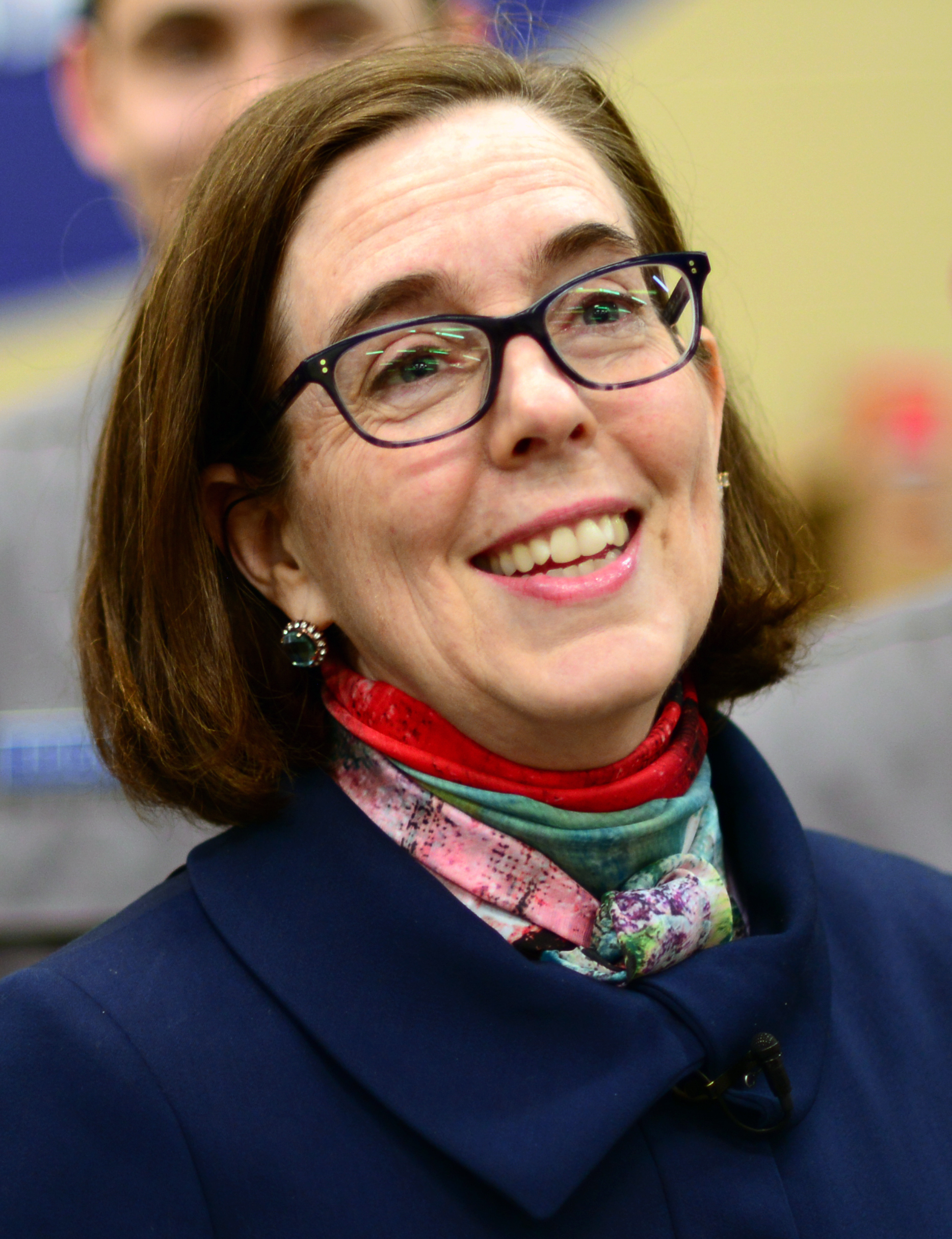
Former Oregon Governor Kate Brown

- Donald G. Brotzman, former U.S. representative for Colorado
- Hank Brown, U.S. senator; U.S. representative; former president of the University of Northern Colorado, and the University of Colorado system
- Kate Brown, 38th governor of Oregon and former secretary of state
- George Alfred Carlson, 20th governor of Colorado
- Morgan Carroll, Colorado State Senate majority leader
- Mary Ann Casey, ambassador to Algeria, Tunisia
- Mike Coffman, mayor of Aurora, Colorado, former U.S. representative for Colorado
- John J. Easton Jr., attorney general of Vermont
- Tsakhiagiin Elbegdorj, leader of non-violent revolution that brought democracy to Mongolia, president of Mongolia, prime minister of Mongolia
- Maria Handley, member-at-large of the Democratic National Committee
- Greg Harris, member of Illinois House of Representatives
- Vicki Huddleston, ambassador to Madagascar, Mali, chief of U.S. Interests Section Havana, Cuba
- Wayne Harold Johnson (Master of Public Administration), Republican member of both houses, consecutively, of the Wyoming State Legislature from Cheyenne, 1993–2017
- Mark Leno, California politician
- Karen Middleton, member, Colorado House of Representatives
- Ed Perlmutter, former U.S. representative for Colorado
- Bill Ritter (Colorado Law School), Denver district attorney, advisor to the U.S. attorney general, governor of Colorado (D)
- Roy Romer (Colorado Law School), former Colorado governor
- Kenneth Rutherford, activist in the International Campaign to Ban Landmines
- Ellen Johnson Sirleaf, president of Liberia
- Richard A. Sossi, Maryland politician
- John Suthers, former mayor of Colorado Springs, former attorney general of Colorado, former United States attorney for the District of Colorado, former district attorney for the 4th Judicial District of Colorado
- Llewellyn Thompson, ambassador to USSR, consul to Moscow, received the Medal of Freedom
- Purnomo Yusgiantoro, minister of Defense of Indonesia, former secretary general of OPEC

=== Other ===
- Stanley Grenz, Christian theologian and ethicist in the Baptist tradition
- J. Edward Guinan, community activist, author of the first DC Statehood referendum, and founder of the Community for Creative Non-Violence
- Henry Laporte, content creator and chef
- Nancy Spungen, girlfriend of punk rock singer Sid Vicious

=== Fictional ===
- Kim Wexler, character in Better Call Saul

== See also ==
- List of colleges and universities in Colorado
- Bibliography of Colorado
- Geography of Colorado
- History of Colorado
- Index of Colorado-related articles
- List of Colorado-related lists
- Outline of Colorado
