= Cascarino =

Cascarino is a surname. Notable people with the surname include:

- Delphine Cascarino (born 1997), French women's footballer
- Estelle Cascarino (born 1997), French women's footballer
- Romeo Cascarino (1922–2002), American classical composer
- Tony Cascarino (born 1962), Irish footballer
