= Robert Sataloff =

American doctor, musician, and writer

- Born: February 22, 1949; Philadelphia, Pennsylvania, United States
- Education: Haverford College; Thomas Jefferson University
- Occupations: Otolaryngologist; Baritone; Author
- Organizations: Drexel University College of Medicine; Academy of Vocal Arts

Robert Thayer Sataloff (born February 22, 1949) is an American otolaryngologist, musician, and author. He is currently a professor and chair of the Department of Otolaryngology – Head and Neck Surgery at Drexel University College of Medicine. He also teaches on the faculty of the Academy of Vocal Arts, and is an adjunct professor at Thomas Jefferson University, and Philadelphia College of Osteopathic Medicine. He is widely recognized for his treatment of voice disorders in professional singers, and has had many celebrity clients. A classically trained baritone, Sataloff has performed professionally as a singer. He is also a composer, and is the founder and longtime music director of the Thomas Jefferson University Choir.

A prolific writer, Sataloff is the author or co-author of 75 books and more than 1,000 publications in a variety of medical and music journals. He is the editor-in-chief of the Journal of Voice, former editor-in-chief of Ear, Nose and Throat Journal (now editor emeritus), associate editor of the Journal of Singing, and serves on the editorial boards of various otolaryngology journals.

== Early life ==
The son of Joseph and Ruth Sataloff, Robert Thayer Sataloff was born on February 22, 1949, in Philadelphia. His father was a pioneering ear surgeon who contributed to the creation of the subspecialty of occupational hearing loss. He began watching his father perform surgeries when he was 8 years old, and from that age would assist his father in harvesting temporal bones from corpses at the morgue on Saturdays. He grew up in Bala Cynwyd, Pennsylvania, and began studying singing seriously at the age of 12. His voice teacher was tenor Howell Zulick. He graduated from Lower Merion High School in 1967 where he was involved in the vocal music program. That same year he won the Tri-County Music Competition.

Sataloff began studies at Haverford College (HC) in 1967. In his freshman year he sang the role of Pilate in the school's April 1968 production of Bach's St Matthew Passion which was presented in a co-production with Beaver College (now Arcadia University). At HC he studied music composition with Harold Boatrite and John Davison, harpsichord with Temple Painter, and conducting with William Reese. He performed the bass solo in Bach's cantata Herr Jesu Christ, wahr' Mensch und Gott, BWV 127, in the Haverford Glee Club's Spring 1969 concert. Not long after he was the bass soloist in Dave Brubeck's oratorio The Light in the Wilderness with Chorus pro Musica of Boston.

In November 1969 Sataloff created the role of Ransom in the world premiere of Donald Swann's opera Perelandra based on the 1943 science fiction novel by C. S. Lewis. This opera was a co-production of the music schools of HC and Bryn Mawr College, and it was reviewed well in the press when it was toured for performances at Riverside Church in New York City. In April 1970 he was a soloist in Bach's Peasant Cantata at Philadelphia's Bach Festival of the Main Line. He performed his senior recital as a baritone at Roberts Hall, HC on May 7, 1971. He graduated with a Bachelor of Arts in Music from HC later that year with an emphasis in music theory and music composition.

== Graduate studies in medicine and music ==
While studying music at HC, Sataloff pursued concurrent studies in medicine at Thomas Jefferson University (TJU) where he initially was enrolled in an MD–PhD program. By the time of his senior year at HC he was working as the conductor of the Thomas Jefferson University Choir (TJUC), an ensemble he founded in 1970 and which he remains conductor of as of 2026. The chorus has occasionally served as the opera chorus for productions of operas staged by the Academy of Vocal Arts (AVA).

Sataloff graduated with a Doctor of Medicine degree from TJU in 1975. He subsequently completed both a Residency and Fellowship in Otolaryngology—Head and Neck Surgery at the University of Michigan (UM). His fellowship was in neuro-otology and skull base surgery. While an intern at UM he met his future wife, Dahlia Mishell, who was a medical student there. They married on October 17, 1976. Dahlia M. Sataloff, a breast surgeon and concert pianist, studied both pre-medicine and piano performance as an undergraduate student. She has served as Robert's accompanist in recitals. Robert was the conductor of the Ann Arbor Community Singers while working and studying at UM. He also was trained by William F. House in cochlear implant surgery.

While working as a surgeon, Staloff pursued graduate studies in vocal music at Combs College of Music. He earned a Doctorate of Musical Arts in vocal performance in 1982. While he has devoted his life primarily to practicing medicine, he performed as an opera singer in stagings of L'Ormindo by Francesco Cavalli and L'Orfeo by Claudio Monteverdi. He has also been active as a recitalist, composer, and conductor.

== Career ==
Sataloff founded his clinical ear, nose, and throat practice in Philadelphia in 1980 where he continued to see patients until April 2024. In 1980 he was appointed a lecturer at AVA, a position he maintains as of 2026. He became head of AVA's voice-science studies program. He concurrently worked as an associate professor of otolaryngology at TJU during the 1980s. During this period he became a pioneer in the field of performing arts medicine in relation to care of the professional voice, and was the author of the first medical textbook material written on the subject. He was the founder and director of the Arts Medicine Center (AMC) at TJU when it was established in 1986. At that time he was one of the few medical doctors who specialized in the care of professional singers. He was featured on CBS Sunday Morning on January 4, 1987.

By 1987 Sataloff was also an instructor at the Curtis Institute of Music in addition to his other work, and by 1989 he was promoted to the role of professor of otolaryngology at TJU. He became a pioneer in cosmetic voice surgery, and was appointed Chairman of the Department of Otorhinolaryngology at Graduate Hospital in Philadelphia. By 2007 he was working as a professor and chair of the Department of Otolaryngology – Head & Neck Surgery at Drexel University College of Medicine. He remains in that position as of 2026, and concurrently works as an adjunct professor at TJU, and Philadelphia College of Osteopathic Medicine.

Sataloff is a past president of the International Association of Phonosurgeons, and is the inventor of more than 100 laryngeal surgical instruments. He also invented several new head and neck surgical techniques. Several well-known singers have been treated by Sataloff, among them Neil Diamond, Patti LuPone, Jon Bon Jovi, Teddy Pendergrass, Joel Grey, Shania Twain, and Benita Valente. He drew wide attention for treating Julie Andrews after another doctor performed vocal-fold surgery that left her unable to sing. He performed surgeries on coach and athlete Bill Cartwright after his larynx was fractured in a basketball game. He also treated author Martha Grimes for spasmodic dysphonia.

Since 1989 Sataloff has been the chairman of the Voice Foundation. With Brenda Smith he co-authored the book Choral Pedagogy (1999, Singular Publishing Group). He is the author or co-author of 75 books and more than 1,000 publications in a variety of medical and music journals. He is the editor-in-chief of the Journal of Voice, former editor-in-chief of Ear, Nose and Throat Journal (now editor emeritus), associate editor of the Journal of Singing, and serves on the editorial boards of various otolaryngology journals.

With his father and L. A. Vasallo, Sataloff co-authored the book Hearing Loss (1980), a book published by Taylor & Francis which has multiple editions. There are also multiple editions of another book they co-authored, Occupational Hearing Loss, which was also published by Taylor & Francis. Father and son also co-authored a paper published inTexas Medicine in 1984 that described hearing loss as "the nation's most prevalent industrial disease" while simultaneously stating it was entirely preventable at little cost. In an interview, Robert Sataloff discussed the need for scientific evidence to influence politicians in their decision making in passing legislation to protect American workers from hearing damage. Many companies, he stated, failed to protect their workers by providing in-expensive ear protection unless they were forced to do so.

== Personal life ==
Robert Sataloff and his wife Dahlia Mishell have twin sons, John and Ben Sataloff. John is a psychiatrist and assistant professor of psychiatry at the University of California, San Francisco. Ben is a healthcare consultant.

== Partial list of publications ==
=== Books ===
- Caputo Rosen, Deborah; Sataloff, Johnathan Brandon; Sataloff, Robert Thayer (2020). Psychology of Voice Disorders. Plural Publishing, Inc. ISBN 9781635502596.
- Hamdan, Abdul Latif; Sataloff, Robert Thayer; Hawkshaw, Mary (2019). Obesity and Voice. Plural Publishing, Inc. ISBN 9781635502657.
- Hamdan, Abdul Latif; Sataloff, Robert Thayer; Hawkshaw, Mary (2020). Non-Laryngeal Cancer and Voice. Plural Publishing, Inc. ISBN 9781635503258.
- Sataloff, Robert Thayer; Brandfonbrener, Alice G.; Lederman, Richard J. (1991). Textbook of Performing Arts Medicine. Raven Press. ISBN 9780881676983.
- Sataloff, Robert Thayer (1997). Professional Voice: The Science and Art of Clinical Care. Singular Publishing Group. ISBN 9781565937284.
- Sataloff, Robert Thayer; Katz, Philip O.; Hawkshaw, Mary; Sataloff, Dahlia (2013). Reflux Laryngitis and Related Disorders, Fourth Edition. Plural Publishing, Inc. ISBN 9781597566384.
- Sataloff, Robert Thayer (2017). Voice Science, Second Edition. Plural Publishing, Inc. ISBN 9781944883751.
- Sataloff, Robert Thayer (2017). Vocal Health and Pedagogy: Science, Assessment, and Treatment, Third Edition. Plural Publishing, Inc. ISBN 9781944883959.
- Sataloff, Robert Thayer; Roehm, Pamela C. (2025). Hearing Loss, Fifth Edition. CRC Press. ISBN 9781040117033.
- Smith, Brenda; Sataloff, Robert Thayer (2013). Choral Pedagogy, Third Edition. Plural Publishing, Inc. ISBN 9781597566063.

=== Journal articles ===
- Garabet, Razmig; Melley, Lauren E.; Sataloff, Robert T. (July 2026). "Noninvasive Management of Voice Disorders: An Umbrella Review". Journal of Voice. 40 (4). doi:10.1016/j.jvoice.2024.03.027.
- Heman-Ackah, Yolanda D.; Michael, Deirdre D.; Sataloff, Robert T. (April 2003). "Cepstral Peak Prominence: A More Reliable Measure of Dysphonia". Annals of Otology, Rhinology & Laryngology. 112 (4).
- Maxwell, Philip J.; Azadeh Ranjbar, Parastou; Sataloff, Robert T. "The Aging Larynx". Journal of Singing. 82 (5). doi:10.53830/sing.00222.
- Meenan, Kirsten; Sataloff, Robert T. (June 2023). "Pulmonary Function Testing in Singers with Voice Difficulties". Journal of Singing. 79 (5). doi:10.53830/slod8018.
- Sataloff, Robert T. (December 1992). "The Human Voice". Scientific American. 267 (6).
- Sataloff, Robert T. (September 2024). "Gluten Sensitivity and Laryngopharyngeal Reflux". Journal of Singing. 81 (1). doi:10.53830/sing.00063.
- Sataloff, Robert T.; Ranjbar, Parastou Azadeh; Balouch, Bailey; Barna, Alexander; Omari, Ahmad Issa Al; Martha, Vishnu; Alnouri, Ghiath (August 2024). "Overlapping otolaryngologic surgery: Safety and efficacy". American Journal of Otolaryngology. 45 (4). doi:10.1016/j.amjoto.2024.104292.
- Sheren, June T.; Sataloff, Robert T. (January 2026). "Menopause and the Singing Voice: An Update on Menopause Care and Menopausal Hormone Therapy". Journal of Singing. 82 (3). doi:10.53830/sing.00186.
- von Leden, H; Sataloff, RT; Riley, W; Alessi, DM (1995). "The Actor and Singer as Patients of the Laryngologist". Otolaryngology–Head and Neck Surgery. 112 (5). doi:10.1016/S0194-5998(05)80185-8.
