= Kathe Perez =

American speech pathologist

Kathe S. Perez is an American speech-language pathologist who developed a voice feminization program. She is the co-creator of the Eva app.

== Life ==
She initially pursued special education for teaching young children with learning and emotional difficulties, which led her to complete a Master of Arts degree from the University of Colorado Boulder in 1986 in speech pathology and speech and voice therapy. She studied under Lorraine Ramig and interned with Robert Sataloff.

In 2000, while Perez had private clinic, a transgender woman asked her for help making her voice more feminine. Perez developed a voice feminization training system, and founded the company Exceptional Voice. In 2009 Perez extended her work to develop the EvaM app for trans men. In 2013, Perez and Annika Kappenstein co-created the Exceptional Voice App (Eva app), with a second version released in 2015. The Eva and EvaM apps combine videos and exercises with real-time feedback to guide the voice training activities, and they have been reviewed by the scientific literature.

Perez has helped trained the voices of auctioneers.

== Selected works ==
- Smith, Marshall E.; Ramig, Lorraine Olson; Dromey, Christopher; Perez, Kathe S.; Samandari, Ráz (December 1995). "Intensive voice treatment in parkinson disease: Laryngostroboscopic findings". Journal of Voice. 9 (4): 453–459. doi:10.1016/S0892-1997(05)80210-3.
- Perez, Kathe S.; Ramig, Lorraine Olson; Smith, Marshall E.; Dromey, Christopher (January 1996). "The Parkinson larynx: Tremor and videostroboscopic findings". Journal of Voice. 10 (4): 354–361. doi:10.1016/S0892-1997(96)80027-0.
- Perez, Kathe; Lynn, Skinner (2000), Vocal versatility in your business the basics, Lakewood, CO: Vocal Versatility Productions, ISBN 0-9705402-0-5, OCLC 47890225
