= Janice Chapman =

Australian-born soprano and singing teacher (born 1938)

Janice Lesley Chapman OAM (born January 1938) is an Australian-born soprano, voice researcher, and vocal consultant working in England. She is the author of Singing and Teaching Singing: A Holistic Approach to Classical Voice first published by Plural Publishing at the end of 2005 (in its fourth edition in 2023), and she has contributed to papers in the Journal of Voice, the Journal of the Acoustical Society of America and Australian Voice. She is also a professor of voice at the Guildhall School of Music and Drama in London.

Her career as a performer includes principal soprano roles in all the major British opera companies, including the Royal Opera House and English National Opera. Since 1975, she has also played an active role in teaching vocal technique, first at London College of Music and then both privately and at the Guildhall School of Music and Drama. She was a founder member of the Voice Research Society, now known as the British Voice Association (BVA), of which she was president for five years. She became a fellow of the BVA in 2012. Chapman is also an honorary president of the Association of Teachers of Singing (AOTOS) in the United Kingdom.

She was awarded the Medal of the Order of Australia for "services to music as an operatic singer and teacher of voice and as a contributor to research into human sound production and vocal health".

== Career ==
Her roles included Sieglinde, Third Norn, Fata Morgana, Aida, Vitellia, Donna Anna, Abigaille, Ellen Orford, Mrs Grose, and Lady Billows. She has broadcast for the BBC and appeared in concerts and recitals worldwide.

Chapman is regarded as one of the world's leading vocal pedagogues – her clients hail from all over Europe and regularly come to London for lessons and mentoring. She is currently a professor of the vocal faculty of the Guildhall School of Music and Drama. She was an invited master teacher at the New Zealand ICVT conference in 1994, again as plenary speaker in Paris in 2008 and most recently in Stockholm in 2017. She also gave the 'Voice of Experience' lecture at the Pan European Voice Conference in Ghent in the Summer of 2017.

Chapman runs yearly multidisciplinary training courses for singing teachers, singers and voice professionals based on her book; Classical Voice Training Ltd. was founded to organise and run the official courses. Previous courses have been held at the Guildhall School of Music and Drama, London, and Chetham's School of Music in Manchester.

Chapman's book, Singing and Teaching Singing – A Holistic Approach to Classical Voice, has been adopted as a course textbook in many universities and colleges worldwide. The fourth edition, co-authored with speech therapist Dr Ron Morris, has been published in 2023, including new chapters and contributing authors, and updated digital resources and an updated glossary of terms.

== Awards ==
Chapman was awarded a Medal of the Order of Australia "for service to music as an operatic singer and teacher of voice, and as a contributor to research into human sound production and vocal health" in the Australia Day Honours, January 2004. In 2010 Chapman was made a fellow and in 2016 a professor of the Guildhall School of Music and Drama. In 2012 the Association of Teachers of Singing in the UK invited her to become an honorary president and she became an honorary president of the British Voice Association.

== Other publications ==
- Bunch, Meribeth; Chapman, Janice (2000). "Taxonomy of singers used as subjects in scientific research". Journal of Voice. 14 (3). Elsevier: 363–369. doi:10.1016/s0892-1997(00)80081-8. ISSN 1401-5439. PMID 11021503.
- Thorpe, C. William; Cala, Stephen; Chapman, Janice; Davis, Pamela (2001). "Patterns of breath support in projection of the singing voice". Journal of Voice. 15 (1). Elsevier: 86–104. doi:10.1016/s0892-1997(01)00009-1. PMID 12269638.
- Reid, Katherine L. P.; Davis, Pamela; Oates, Jennifer; Cabrera, Densil; Ternström, Sten; Black, Michael; Chapman, Janice (2006). "The Acoustic Characteristics of Professional Opera Singers Performing in Chorus Versus Solo Mode". Journal of Voice. 21 (1). Elsevier: 35–45. doi:10.1016/j.jvoice.2005.08.010. PMID 16427767.
- Oates, Jennifer; Bain, Belinda; Davis, Pamela; Chapman, Janice; Kenny, Dianna (2005). "Development of an Auditory-Perceptual Rating Instrument for the Operatic Singing Voice". Journal of Voice. 20 (1). Elsevier: 71–81. doi:10.1016/j.jvoice.2005.01.006. PMID 16051464.
