= Harold Boatrite =

American composer (1932–2021)

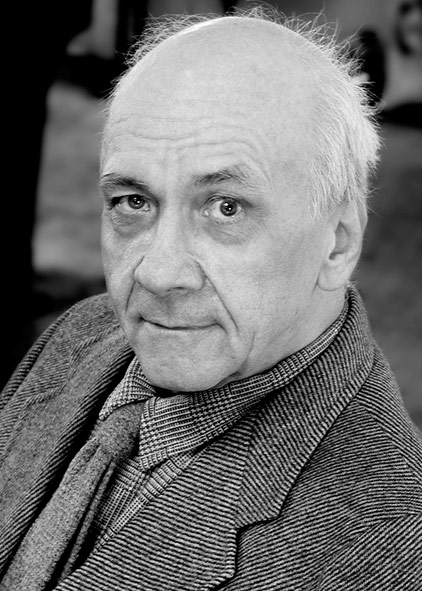
Harold Boatrite in 2002 photograph by Elliot Hoffman

Harold Boatrite (April 2, 1932 – April 26, 2021) was an American composer.

After early studies with Stanley Hollingsworth, Harold Boatrite was awarded a fellowship to the Tanglewood Music Center where he studied composition with Lukas Foss and took part in the orchestration seminars of Aaron Copland. In 1961 he was invited by Rudolf Serkin to be composer-in-residence at the Marlboro Music Festival.

He received an honorary doctorate in 1967 from the Combs College of Music and was subsequently appointed to the faculty of Haverford College, where he taught theory and composition until 1980. During that time ( 1974 to 1977 ) he served on the music panel of Pennsylvania Council on the Arts. One of his music composition students at Haverford was Robert Sataloff.

In honor of his fiftieth birthday in 1982, a series of concerts devoted exclusively to his music were presented by the Pennsylvania Alliance for American Music. Among the participants in the series were the Chamber Orchestra of Philadelphia, the Thomas Jefferson University Choir and the Mendelssohn Club of Philadelphia. Boatrite has written in a wide variety of media ranging from solo and chamber pieces to large-scale choral and orchestral works. His music has been heard throughout the United States and in Europe, most notably, at the Prague Autumn International Music Festival.

He has received many commissions including a concerto for piano and orchestra for the National Association of Composers USA, a concerto for harpsichord and strings commissioned by Temple Painter, Fantasia on a Gregorian Tune for string orchestra, harpsichord, celesta and boy choir commissioned by the Samuel S. Fels Fund, and a ballet, "Childermas," for CBS-TV which premiered on national television in 1969.

In 1992 Boatrite was appointed composer-in-residence for the Conductors Institute at the University of South Carolina. He served for many years as new music consultant to the Chamber Orchestra of Philadelphia. His chamber music is recorded on the Capstone label and his orchestral scores are housed in the Edwin A. Fleisher Orchestral Collection, Free Library of Philadelphia.

One of Boatrite's later projects was the completion of a series of Latin motets for unaccompanied chorus.

== Selected works ==
- "Study on a Welsh Tune" for Pipe Organ (1953)
- Song Cycle: Night Songs for High Voice and Piano (words by Lydia Ann Francis and Edgar Allan Poe) (1954–1960)
- Sonata for Piano (1956)
- Three Alleluias for A Cappella Chorus (1957)
- Lyric Suite for Piano (1957)
- Elegy for String Orchestra (1958)
- String Quartet (1959)
- Sonata-Fantasia for Harpsichord (1960)
- Sonata for Cello and Piano (1961)
- Suite for Harpsichord (1961)
- Sonata for Flute and Piano (1963)
- Concerto for Harpsichord and String Orchestra (1964)
- Voluntary for Three Trumpets and Organ (1964)
- Serenade for Oboe and Strings (1965)
- Largo and Allegro for Piano and Orchestra (Piano concerto) (1972)
- "War Anthem for Chorus and Orchestra" (A.K.A. Choral Elegy) Words by Stephen Crane (1973)
- "Fantasia on a Gregorian Tune" for Harpsichord, Celesta, Strings and Boy Choir (1982)
- Villanelle: Rounds for A Cappella Chorus (Words by Frank Wilson) (1984)
- A Cappella Motets: "Qui Seminant", "Ave Maria", "The Holy Child" (1984–2004)
- Seven Miniatures for Piano (1965–1997)
- Adagio and Fugue for String Orchestra (2000)
- Three Etudes for Piano Requiring the Middle Pedal (2004)
- A Cappella Motet: "Clamaverunt Justi" (2006)

== Selected Music ==
Suite for Harpsichord; Pastorale
Performer: Temple Painter

Suite for Harpsichord; Chaconne
Performer: Temple Painter
