= Ianthe Onelia Marini =

American choral conductor, actress, and singer

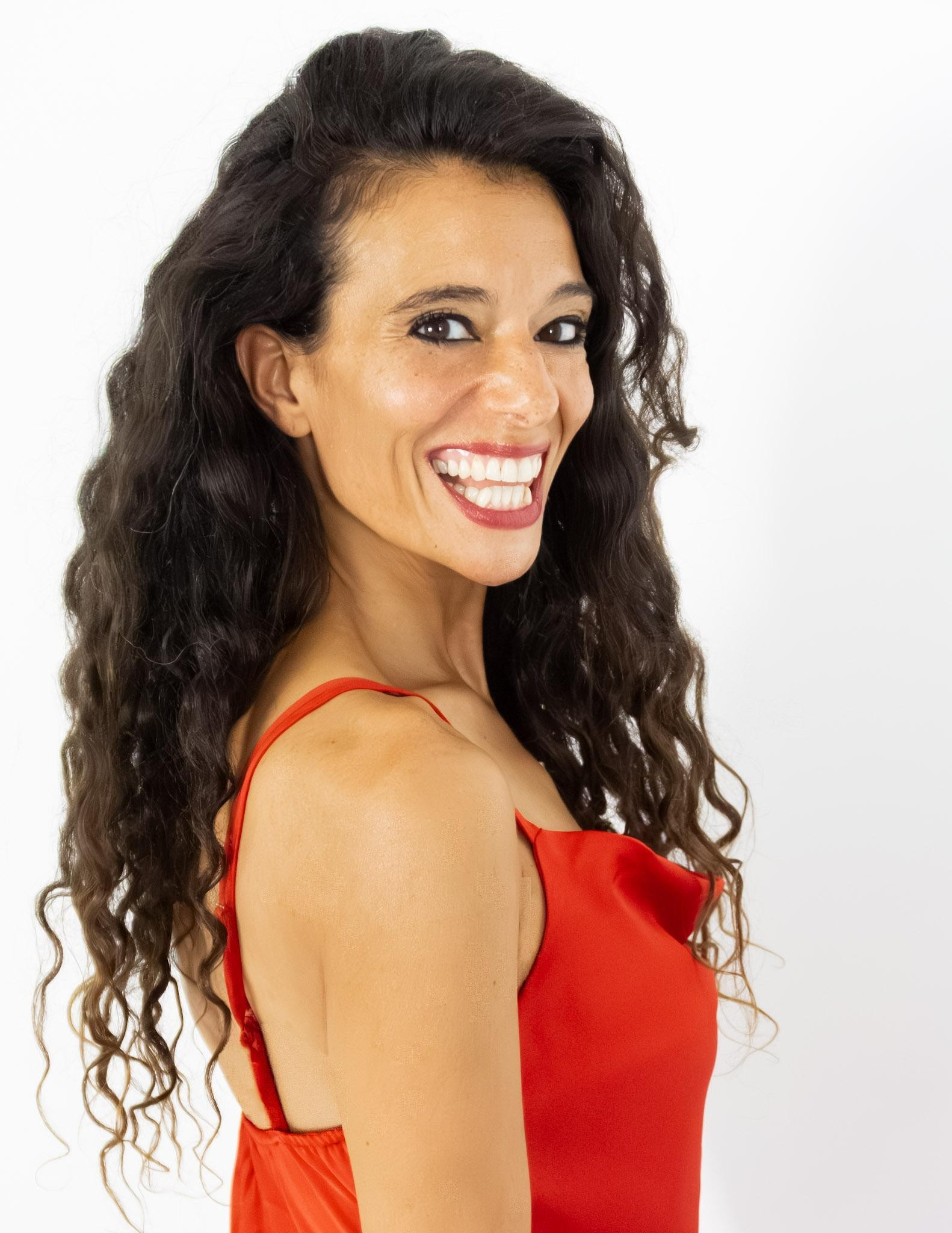
- Born: August 21, 1985 (age 40); Boston area, Massachusetts, U.S.
- Education: Doctorate of Musical Arts, University of Maryland, College Park M.M. in Choral Conducting, Temple University B.S. in Music Education, Pennsylvania State University
- Occupations: Conductor, Actor, University Professor, Singer, Published writer
- Years active: 2000s–present
- Organization(s): AEA, AGMA
- Website: ianthemarini.org

Ianthe Onelia Marini (born August 21, 1985) is an American choral conductor, actress, and singer. She is a member of the Actors' Equity Association (AEA) and the American Guild of Musical Artists (AGMA). She formerly held the Paul S. and Jean R. Amos Distinguished Chair for Choral Activities at the Schwob School of Music at Columbus State University. She is represented by Matilda Comers at Fictious Management.

== Education ==
Marini earned a Doctorate of Musical Arts from the University of Maryland, College Park, where she received the Pomeroy Prize for Scholarship of 17th-century Music; a Master of Music in Choral Conducting from Temple University, where she received the Elaine Brown Memorial Scholarship and the Helen Laird Scholarship for Academic Achievement; and a Bachelor of Science in Music Education from Pennsylvania State University, where she received the Creative Achievement Award. As an actress, Ianthe has taken classes at Circle in the Square Theatre School (NYC), BGB Studios (LA), UCB, and Barbara Cook Masterclasses.

== Career ==
Conducting

Prior to her doctoral studies, Marini served as High School Choral Director and Musical Theater Music Director at Stoughton High School in Massachusetts. At the University of Maryland, she served as the first female conductor of the University of Maryland Men's Chorus. Between 2014 and 2017, she prepared the University of Maryland choruses to sing for the National Symphony Orchestra in Washington, D.C., and the Baltimore Symphony Orchestra in Baltimore for performances at the Kennedy Center, including Handel's Messiah under Nathalie Stutzmann, works of Sir James MacMillan under his own baton, and Pops performances under Steven Reineke and Jack Everly.

Marini joined the Schwob School of Music at Columbus State University (CSU) from 2017 to 2021 as the Paul S. and Jean R. Amos Distinguished Chair for Choral Activities and Assistant Professor of Music. She was the founding faculty advisor of the Black Schwob Society, a student organization focused on equity and representation in classical music, and prepared choruses for the Columbus Symphony Orchestra, as well as the National Concerts Orchestra's Carnegie Hall premiere of Jocelyn Hagen's The Notebooks of Leonardo.

In 2019, she received The American Prize in Conducting in the college/university choral division.

Acting

Marini had a leading role in The Experience Project with the American Repertory Theater in Cambridge, Massachusetts, an improvisational production directed by Mikhael Tara Garver, experiential director and designer for social impact. Her stage work includes performances at Will Geer's Theatricum Botanicum in Topanga Canyon, California, in Ellen Geer's adaptation Wendy's Peter Pan and A Midsummer Night's Dream. She appeared with the San Francisco Opera in Omar, the Pulitzer Prize-winning opera by Rhiannon Giddens and Michael Abels, and performed in Westerly Breath, an original opera by Hamed Sinno, produced by The Industry opera company.^{[Citation needed]} She has appeared twice with the Springer Opera House, Georgia's historic state theater, in their production of Chicago and as pit conductor of Evita.

As a concert performer, Marini has appeared as a soloist with the Musica Angelica Baroque Orchestra and with the LA Camerata.

She received a Best Actress in a Musical award from Boston Broadway Awards for her performance as Anita in West Side Story.

== Publications ==
Marini's doctoral dissertation, "The Effects of Acting on Choral Singing," was referenced in The Journal of Singing. She is a contributor to The Choral Conductor's Companion, edited by Brian J. Winnie
