= Southwest Conference =

Former United States college athletics league

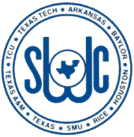
- Formerly: Southwest Intercollegiate Athletic Conference
- Association: NCAA
- Founded: 1914; 112 years ago
- Folded: 1996; 30 years ago
- Division: Division I
- Subdivision: Division I-A
- No. of teams: 8 (final), 13 (total)
- Headquarters: Dallas, Texas
- Region: South Central United States

Locations

The Southwest Conference (SWC) was an NCAA Division I college athletic conference in the United States that existed from 1914 to 1996. Composed primarily of schools from Texas, at various times the conference also included schools from Oklahoma and Arkansas.

For most of its history, the core members of the conference were Texas-based schools plus one in Arkansas: Baylor University, Rice University, Southern Methodist University (SMU), University of Texas at Austin, Texas A&M University, Texas Christian University (TCU), Texas Tech University, University of Houston, and the University of Arkansas.

After a long period of stability and success, the conference's overall athletic prowess began to decline throughout the 1980s, due in part to numerous member schools violating NCAA recruiting rules, culminating in the suspension of the entire SMU football program ("death penalty") for the 1987 and 1988 seasons.

Arkansas, after years of feeling like an outsider in the conference, left after the 1990–91 school year to join the Southeastern Conference, although they did compete in the SWC in football for the 1991 season. Five years later, the conference precipitously broke up as Baylor, Texas, Texas A&M, and Texas Tech (which had entered in 1956 from the Border Conference) combined with the members of the former Big Eight Conference to form a new league, the Big 12 Conference, while Rice, SMU, TCU, and Houston found homes in less prominent conferences, with TCU and Houston later joining the Big 12 themselves and SMU later joining the ACC.

== History ==
=== Early years ===
L. Theo Bellmont, the University of Texas athletic director, sent out questionnaires to schools in Texas and neighboring states to gauge their interest in organizing an athletic conference. By March 1, 1914, a number of schools had responded favorably to the idea.

The first organizational meeting of the conference was set for April 30, 1914; since not all schools involved could send representatives to attend that date, it was ultimately held on May 5 and 7 at the Oriental Hotel in Dallas, Texas. It was chaired by Bellmont, who originally wanted Louisiana State University and the University of Mississippi to join the conference as well, but they declined to do so. The Southwest Intercollegiate Athletic Conference became an official body on December 8 at a formal meeting at the Rice Hotel in Houston.

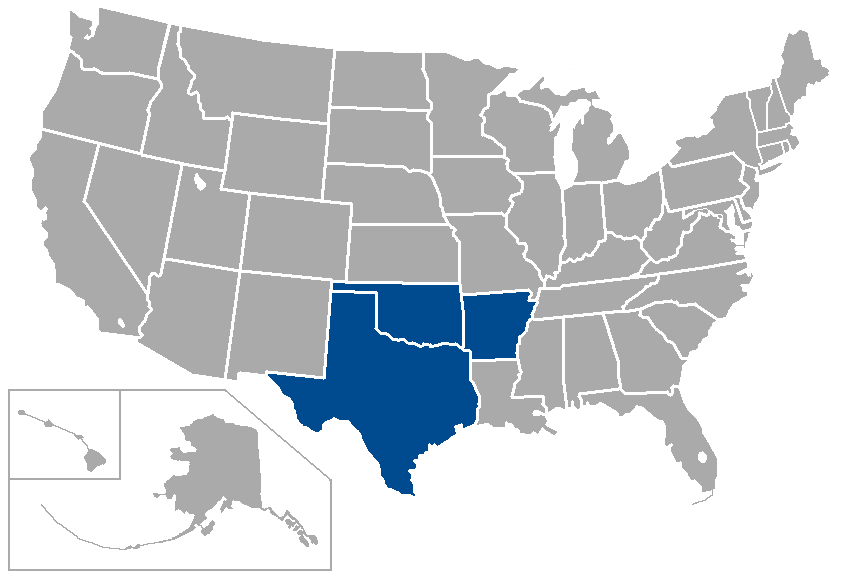
Southwest Conference, 1915–1925

Its early years saw fluctuation in membership; Southwestern (a comparatively smaller school) dropped out of the conference in 1916, and Southern Methodist University (SMU) joined in 1918, while Texas Christian University (TCU) became a member in 1923. Rice University left the conference in 1916, only to rejoin in 1918.

Phillips University competed as a conference member for one year (1920). Oklahoma departed in 1919 to join the Missouri Valley Intercollegiate Athletic Association (later reorganized as the Big Eight Conference) and was followed by Oklahoma A&M in 1925. The series between Texas and Oklahoma would still continue as a non-conference matchup in the annual Red River Rivalry game held in Dallas. From 1925 until 1991, the University of Arkansas would be the only conference member geographically outside the state of Texas.

=== Prime years ===
By 1925, the conference's name was shortened to simply Southwest Conference. After its organizational years, the conference settled into regularly scheduled meetings among its members and began to gain stature nationwide. The SWC would be guided by seven commissioners, the first of whom, P. W. St. Clair, was appointed in 1938. In 1940, the conference took control of the then five-year-old Cotton Bowl Classic, which further established the prestige of both the bowl and the conference. Texas Technological College (now Texas Tech University) joined the SWC in 1958 from the Border Conference followed by the University of Houston for the 1976 season (Houston proceeded to win the SWC football championship in its first season of league play).

The two glory periods of the conference happened during the 1930s and the 1960s. In 1935, the last year before the AP Poll, both SMU and TCU claimed the national title. The 2 teams had played in one of the first games labeled "game of the century" on November 30 of that year. In 1938, TCU won the AP national title. In 1939, the SWC achieved back to back national titles when Texas A&M won the AP Poll.

In the 1960s, the SWC was dominated by two teams: Texas and Arkansas. Texas won the 1963 national championship, and Arkansas won a national championship in 1964 in the Football Writers Association of America (FWAA) and Helms Athletic Foundation (HAF) polls. In 1969, Texas won another national championship by beating #2-ranked Arkansas 15–14 in the regular season's final game (dubbed the "Big Shootout"). The 1969 Arkansas–Texas game in Fayetteville, Arkansas with President Richard Nixon in attendance is usually counted among the greatest college football games ever played. Texas also won the 1970 United Press International (UPI) National Championship (i.e., the coaches' poll), which until 1974 was awarded prior to the bowl games. Texas lost the Cotton Bowl Classic following the 1970 season to Notre Dame by a score of 24–11, giving the Associated Press (AP) Championship to Nebraska after they beat LSU by a score of 17–12 in the Orange Bowl.

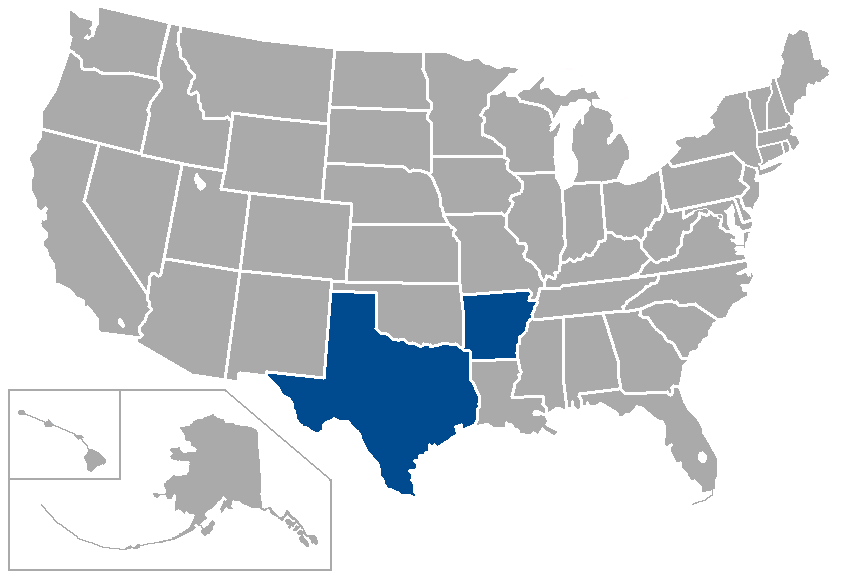
Southwest Conference, 1925–1991

Since its first Cotton Bowl Classic and lasting until 1995, the Southwest Conference Champion automatically received an invitation to be the "host" team in the Cotton Bowl Classic game on New Year's Day in Dallas. Opponents usually were the runners-up from the Big Eight Conference or the Southeastern Conference although independents Penn State and Notre Dame were also often featured. Circa the 1940s onward, the Cotton Bowl Classic was included among the four major bowl games and not infrequently had national championship implications. Near the turn of the century however, the game declined in importance largely due to the decline of SWC prominence. In 1977, Notre Dame became the last team to win a national championship in the Cotton Bowl Classic by beating Texas in the January 1978 game. Texas might have been awarded the national championship in 1983 had they won the January 1984 game, but they were bested by Georgia 10-9.

The early 1980s were the glory years of SWC basketball, including the Phi Slama Jama teams at the University of Houston. The most consistent program during the last quarter of the 20th century was the University of Arkansas with Sweet 16 appearances in 1978, 1979, 1981, 1983, 1990, 1991, Elite 8 appearances in 1978, 1979, 1990, and 1991, and Final Four appearances in 1978 and 1990. Arkansas's famed Triplets - Marvin Delph, Ron Brewer and Sidney Moncrief - gave the rest of the league fits. The Razorbacks' Lee Mayberry, Todd Day, and Oliver Miller won three straight SWC regular season and tournament titles from 1989 to 1991, the school's last three seasons in the conference. The passion of Arkansas fans for their Razorbacks often overran the confines of SWC basketball venues, so much so, that Reunion Arena in Dallas (annual site of the SWC postseason tournament) was deemed "Barnhill South" (after the Razorbacks' on-campus arena) based on the numbers and intensity of Hog fans present. Arkansas would go on to win the 1994 national championship.

The Texas Longhorns baseball program under coach Cliff Gustafson won national titles in 1975 and 1983 as well as titles under Bibb Falk in 1949 and 1950. The Longhorns have won 2 more national titles in 2002 and 2005 as members of the Big XII. Texas dominated the SWC for several years, winning an incredible 64 conference championships between 1915 and 1996. Texas would make it to a record 27 College World Series during their time in the SWC, with that number increasing to 38 as of 2025. The Arkansas Razorbacks also fielded fine teams that advanced to the College World Series. The Hogs finished runners-up in 1979, 3rd in 1985, and 5th in both the 1987 and 1989 seasons. The Hogs have continued this tradition since moving to the SEC, reaching the CWS seven times under Arkansas alumnus Dave Van Horn, and were the 2018 national runners-up. Texas A&M rose to power in the late 1980s, going 58–5 in 1989 before losing twice in the regional championship round on its home field to LSU. The Aggies reached the College World Series in 1993. Rice began its ascent to college baseball's elite in the conference's final years under coach Wayne Graham, reaching the CWS in 1997, the year after the conference disbanded. Graham and the Owls would win the CWS national title in 2003 as members of the WAC.

The Arkansas Razorbacks were dominant in track and field winning 15 SWC cross country team titles, 11 SWC indoor track team titles, 9 SWC outdoor track team titles, and an incredible 8 SWC triple crowns (cross country, indoor track and outdoor track champions all in the same season). During their SWC days, the Razorbacks won 14 NCAA national team championships and one NCAA team triple crown. The list of Arkansas individual SWC champions and individual NCAA champions is long. Standout coaches and athletes include the legendary John McDonnell of Arkansas, the winningest coach in NCAA history regardless of sport. Arkansas has now won 42 national championships in men's track and cross country, and 8 in women's. Baylor's Michael Johnson, Texas A&M's Randy Matson, Rice's Fred Hansen, Houston's Carl Lewis, and Arkansas' Mike Conley all went on to win Olympic gold medals.

=== Final years ===
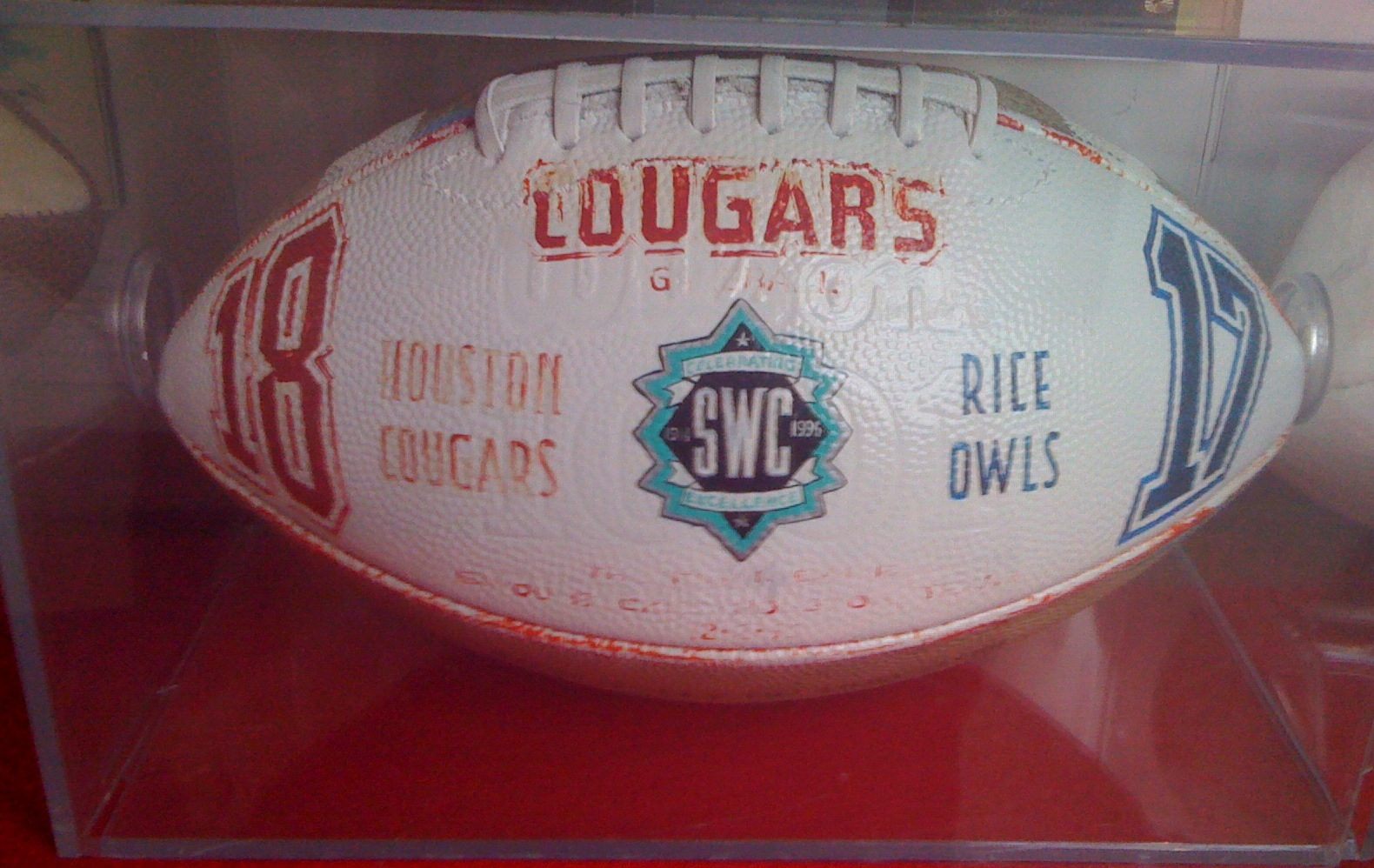
The game ball from the 1995 Bayou Bucket Classic, the last football game in Southwest Conference history

The 1980s saw many of the conference's athletic programs hit by recruiting scandals and NCAA probations. The only programs to escape probation in the 1980s were Arkansas, Baylor, and Rice. Because of repeated major violations, in 1987, the SMU Mustangs football program became only the third in NCAA history to receive the so-called "death penalty" (after Kentucky basketball in 1952–53 and Southwestern Louisiana basketball from 1973 to 1975). The NCAA canceled SMU's 1987 season, and limited it to seven road games for 1988. However, nearly all of the school's lettermen transferred elsewhere, forcing SMU to keep its football program shuttered for 1988 as well. SMU also remained on probation until 1990. At that time, NCAA rules prohibited schools on probation from appearing on live television. As a result, the conference's market share in television coverage dwindled.

The SWC's performance in football declined precipitously. The last SWC football champion to win a bowl game was Texas A&M, who beat Notre Dame in the 1988 Cotton Bowl Classic by a score of 35–10. Since then, the final eight SWC champions lost in their bowl games. After SMU's second-place finish in most polls in 1982, SWC programs usually were not serious contenders for the national title. For instance: Texas had strong teams in 1981, 1983, 1990, and 1995. Arkansas earned national recognition in 1988 and 1989, and Texas A&M was competitive from 1985 to 1995. By the end of their respective seasons however, none of these football teams were able to remain in the national championship hunt.

==== The last days of the College Football Association ====
On June 27, 1984, the U.S. Supreme Court ruled in NCAA v. Board of Regents of the University of Oklahoma that the NCAA could not punish its membership for selling their media content. As a result, individual schools and athletic conferences were freed to negotiate contracts on their own behalf. The Big Ten and Pacific-10 conferences sold their rights to CBS and ABC. Most of the rest of the Division I-A football programs (what is now called the Division I Football Bowl Subdivision) chose to sell their rights together through an organization called the College Football Association to ABC and CBS. The primary function of the CFA was to negotiate television broadcast rights for its member conferences and independent colleges.

By 1990, the television landscape had changed and a number of the stronger programs saw opportunities for better deals outside of the CFA. This was spearheaded by Notre Dame, who left the CFA and sold their home game broadcast rights to NBC in time for the 1991 season.

When the Southeastern Conference (SEC) invited the University of Arkansas and the University of South Carolina to join the conference in 1990, it created shockwaves across the CFA. The other conferences in the CFA correctly assumed the SEC made these additions to create a better TV product with the idea of leaving the CFA. The SEC represented one of the more valuable assets in the CFA. It seemed likely that if the SEC departed, other conferences would have a more difficult time securing preferable TV deals.

In February 1994, the Southeastern Conference announced that they would be leaving the CFA and would negotiate independently for a television deal that covered SEC schools only. This led The Dallas Morning News to proclaim that "the College Football Association as a television entity is dead". In 1995, the SEC and the Big East broke from the CFA, signing a national deal with CBS. The SEC would earn a then-staggering $95 million from the deal. More significantly, this change in television contracts ultimately would lead to significant realignment of college conferences, with the SWC's demise triggering the first major realignment. (After the SWC's demise, another major realignment took place in the mid-2000s, with an even more dramatic realignment in the early 2010s and a third one now ongoing.)

Arkansas' departure for the Southeastern Conference marked the beginning of the end for the Southwest Conference. After this announcement, Metro Conference member Tulane and Independent Miami were both seriously considered by the SWC to join the conference as replacements for Arkansas. In March 1994, Texas, Texas A&M, Baylor, and Texas Tech accepted invitations to join with the members of the Big Eight Conference to form the Big 12 Conference. Soon afterward, Rice, SMU, and TCU accepted invitations to join the Western Athletic Conference, while Houston became a charter member of Conference USA. The Bayou Bucket game between Houston and Rice was the last football game played in the conference. In May 1996, after the completion of championship matches in baseball and track & field, the Southwest Conference was officially dissolved.

== Legacy ==
Over the course of its 82-year history, teams of the Southwest Conference garnered 64 recognized national championships in collegiate sports.

The SWC had many legendary players and coaches over the years. In football, John Heisman, Dana X. Bible, Paul "Bear" Bryant, Darrell Royal, Frank Broyles, Hayden Fry, Lou Holtz, Bill Yeoman, Gene Stallings, and Grant Teaff all served as head coaches in the conference. Some notable SWC players included Davey O'Brien, Sammy Baugh, Bobby Layne, Doak Walker, Tom Landry, Bob Lilly, Don Meredith, Earl Campbell, Andre Ware, Mike Singletary, John David Crow, Lance Alworth, Dan Hampton, Steve Atwater, Joe Ferguson, and Eric Dickerson. The trio of kicking contemporaries Steve Little of Arkansas, Tony Franklin of Texas A&M, and Russell Erxleben of Texas all kicked record setting field goals of 60 + yards in the same season.

Outstanding basketball coaches included Nolan Richardson, Tom Penders, Eddie Sutton, Abe Lemons, Guy V. Lewis, Shelby Metcalf, and Gerald Myers. Great SWC hoops players included the aforementioned Triplets, Hakeem Olajuwon, Clyde Drexler, Vinnie Johnson, Jon Koncak, Alvin Robertson, Ricky Pierce, Darrell Walker, Joe Kleine, Day, Mayberry, Miller, and U.S. Reed among others.

In 1997, the official records of the conference from 1914 to 1996 were moved from Dallas to the campus of Texas Tech University, becoming part of the Southwest Collection/Special Collections Library. The archive also contains an extensive assortment of images and memorabilia from each member university. The final commissioner of the Southwest Conference (1995-96) Kyle Kallander has the rights to all SWC brands and copyrights (he later served as commissioner of the Big South Conference from 1996-2023), and retired assistant commissioner Bo Carter is considered as the SWC historian.

== Member universities ==
Southwest Conference Members
full member
full member (joined after 1955)
full member (departed before 1925)
full member (departed 1991)

=== Membership timeline ===
Full members Full members (non-football)
Associate member (football) Independent
Other Conference Other Conference
Texas Intercollegiate Athletic Association
Missouri Valley Intercollegiate Athletic Association
Big 12 Conference Southeastern Conference

=== Full members ===
Institution	Acronym	Location	Founded	Joined	Left	Type	Subsequent conference	Intermediate conference(s)	Current conference
University of Arkansas	U of A	Fayetteville, Arkansas	1871	1915	1991	Public	Southeastern Conference (SEC) (1991–present)		
Baylor University	BU	Waco, Texas	1845	1915	1996	Private (Baptist)	Big 12 Conference (1996–present)		
University of Houston	UH; UofH	Houston, Texas	1927	1972 (Note: Houston was invited to join the SWC in March 1971, and began play in all sports except football and basketball in 1972–73. Cougar basketball joined the fray in 1975–76, and football was last to join for the 1976–77 school year.)	1996	Public	Conference USA (1996–2013)	American Athletic Conference (AAC) (2013–2023)	Big 12 Conference (2023–present)
Rice University	Rice	Houston, Texas	1912	1915 (Note: 1915–1917 were provisional seasons)	1996	Private	Western Athletic Conference (WAC) (1996–2005)	Conference USA (2005–2023)	American Conference (Note: Previously known as the American Athletic Conference (AAC) until 2025) (2023–present)
Southern Methodist University	SMU	University Park, Texas	1911	1918	1996	Private (Methodist)	Western Athletic Conference (WAC) (1996–2005)	Conference USA (2005–2013); American Athletic Conference (AAC) (2013–2024)	Atlantic Coast Conference (ACC) (2024–present)
University of Texas at Austin	UT; UT Austin	Austin, Texas	1883	1915	1996	Public	Big 12 Conference (1996–2024)		Southeastern Conference (SEC) (2024–present)
Texas A&M University	A&M; TAMU	College Station, Texas	1876	1915	1996	Public	Big 12 Conference (1996–2012)		Southeastern Conference (SEC) (2012–present)
Texas Christian University	TCU	Fort Worth, Texas	1873	1923	1996	Private (DOC)	Western Athletic Conference (WAC) (1996–2001)	Conference USA (2001–2005); Mountain West Conference (MWC) (2005–2012) (Note: In December 2010, TCU announced it would join the Big East Conference on July 1, 2012, but instead accepted an invitation to the Big 12 Conference in October 2011.)	Big 12 Conference (2012–present)
Texas Tech University	TTU; Tech	Lubbock, Texas	1923	1956	1996	Public	Big 12 Conference (1996–present)		

=== Full members departing before 1925 ===
Institution	Acronym	Location	Founded	Joined	Left	Type	Subsequent conference	Intermediate conference(s)	Current conference
University of Oklahoma	OU	Norman, Oklahoma	1890	1915	1920	Public	Missouri Valley Intercollegiate Athletic Association (MVIAA) (Note: The MVIAA split into the Big 6 (still operating legally as the MVIAA) and the MVC in 1928 with Oklahoma joining the former and Oklahoma State the latter.)	Big 6 (Note: Big 8 upon Oklahoma A&M's arrival) (1928–1996); Big 12 Conference (1996–2024)	Southeastern Conference (SEC) (2024–present)
Oklahoma A&M	OSU; OK State	Stillwater, Oklahoma	1890	1915	1925	Public	Missouri Valley Intercollegiate Athletic Association (MVIAA)	Missouri Valley Conference (MVC) (1928–1958); Big 8 (1958–1996)	Big 12 Conference (1996–present)
Phillips University	Phillips	Enid, Oklahoma	1906	1920	1921	Private (DOC)	Independent	Sooner Athletic Conference (1978–1998)	N/A (Note: Closed in 1998)
Southwestern University	Southwestern; SU	Georgetown, Texas	1840	1915	1917	Private (Methodist)	Texas Intercollegiate Athletic Association (TIAA) (1909–1927) (Note: Concurrent membership with both the SWC and the TIAA from 1915 to 1917)	Texas Conference (1927–1956); Big State Conference (1956–1983); Independent (1983–1994); Southern Collegiate Athletic Conference (SCAC) (1994–2025)	Southern Athletic Association (SAA) (2025–2027); Southern Collegiate Athletic Conference (SCAC) (2027–future)

== Commissioners ==
- James W. St. Clair (1938–1945)
- James H. Stewart (1945–1950)
- Howard Grubbs (1950–1973)
- Cliff Speegle (1973–1982)
- Fred Jacoby (1982–1993)
- Steven J. Hatchell (1993–1995)
- Kyle Kallander (1995–1996)

== Conference facilities ==
This is a listing of the conference facilities as of the 1995–96 school year, the conference's last. Capacities and venue names are also current for 1995–96.

School	Football stadium	Capacity	Basketball arena	Capacity	Baseball Stadium	Capacity
Baylor	Floyd Casey Stadium	50,000	Ferrell Center	10,084	Old Baylor Ballpark	1,500
Houston	Astrodome	56,000	Hofheinz Pavilion	9,000	Cougar Park	4,000
Rice	Rice Stadium	70,000	Autry Court	5,000	Cameron Field	1,000
SMU	Cotton Bowl / Texas Stadium	68,000 / 65,675	Moody Coliseum	9,000	No team	Morrison-Bell Field (program ended in 1980)
Texas	Texas Memorial Stadium	77,500	Frank Erwin Center	16,300	Disch–Falk Field	6,649
Texas A&M	Kyle Field	70,210	G. Rollie White Coliseum	7,800	Olsen Field	6,100
TCU	Amon G. Carter Stadium	44,008	Daniel–Meyer Coliseum	7,200	TCU Diamond	1,500
Texas Tech	Jones Stadium	50,000	Lubbock Municipal Coliseum	8,344	Dan Law Field	5,500

== See also ==
- List of defunct college football conferences
