= Tom Garfinkel =

American sports executive

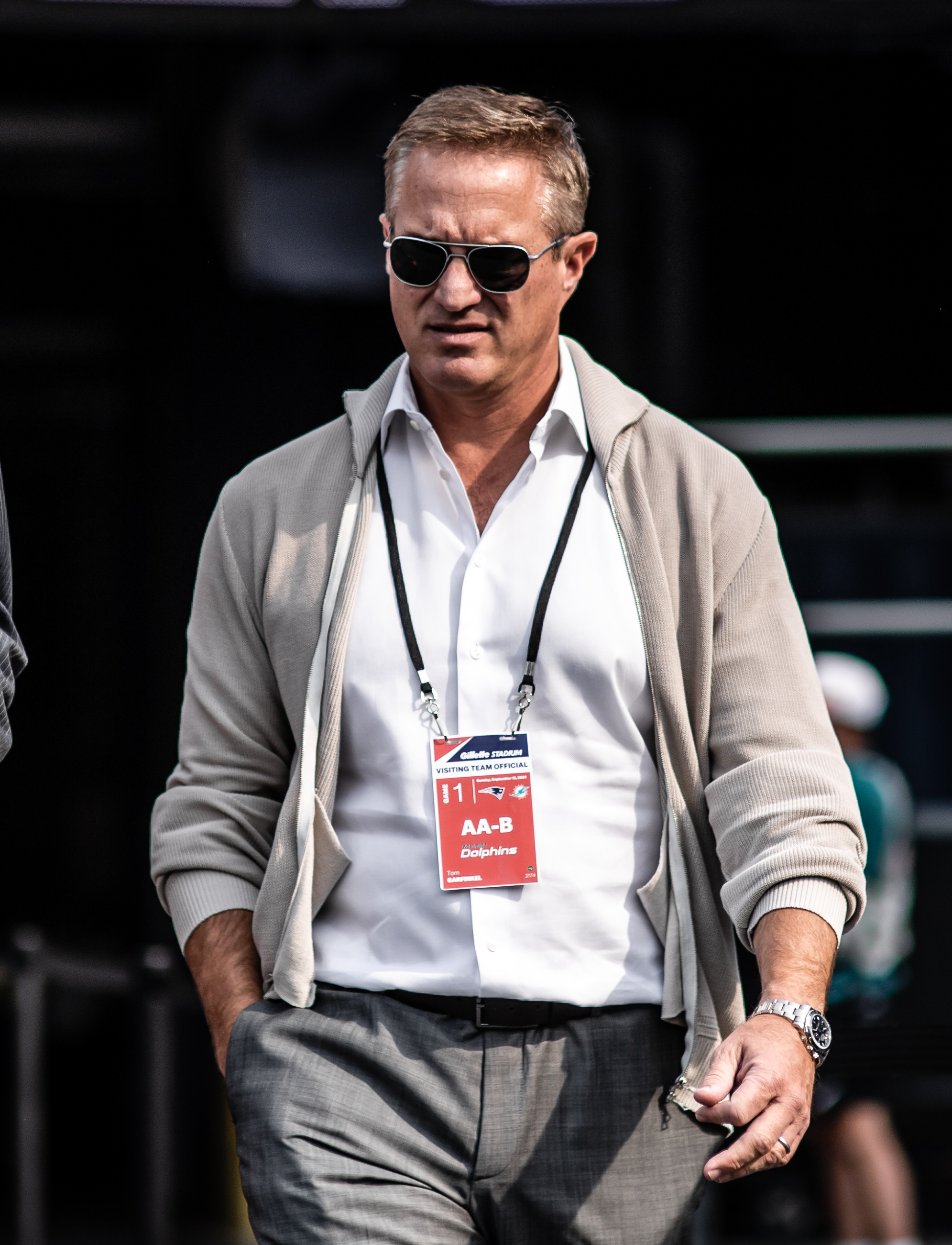
Garfinkel walks onto the field prior to an NFL football game between the Miami Dolphins and New England Patriots, Sunday, Sept. 12, 2021 in Foxborough, Mass.

Tom Garfinkel is an American sports executive who formally served as vice chairman, president and CEO of the Miami Dolphins and Hard Rock Stadium and managing partner of the Formula One Miami Grand Prix.

== Education ==
Garfinkel graduated with a bachelor's degree from the University of Colorado, Boulder and earned his MBA at the University of Michigan's Ross School of Business.

== Career ==
Garfinkel held numerous leadership roles in sales, marketing and branding with Miller Brewing Company and Texaco before entering the sports industry. From 2001 to 2006 he oversaw business operations for Chip Ganassi Racing. He then served as executive vice president and chief operating officer of the Arizona Diamondbacks. In 2009 he joined the San Diego Padres as president and COO. In 2012 he was promoted to CEO. Garfinkel left the Padres in 2013 and was named president and chief executive officer of the Miami Dolphins and Hard Rock Stadium two months later. He also serves as managing partner of the Miami Grand Prix, a Formula One race that takes place around Hard Rock Stadium.

== Arizona Diamondbacks ==
In 2008, Garfinkel helped deliver the highest controllable revenue in the franchise’s history. He also lead the organization’s efforts to redesign the concourses at Chase Field.

== San Diego Padres ==
Garfinkel joined the Padres as president and COO in 2009 and was promoted to CEO in 2012. During his tenure with the team, Garfinkel created the Youth Baseball Initiative, which provided jerseys to over 850 Little League teams, helped broker a $1.2 billion television deal with Fox Sports San Diego, and was credited with raising the team's season-ticket base. Garfinkel also helped the Padres become the first Major League Baseball team to develop a comprehensive initiative to build awareness for Stand Up to Cancer.

In 2011 and 2012 the Padres had the top ticket sales and service team in baseball according to a survey in SportsBusiness Journal. He resigned from the Padres on July 9, 2013.

== Miami Dolphins ==
On September 9, 2013, Garfinkel was named president and chief executive officer of the Miami Dolphins and Hard Rock Stadium. He helped oversee the team’s in-house sale of naming rights to “Hard Rock Stadium”. He also led the execution of a privately funded $550 million renovation plan to modernize the stadium, which included the installation of a canopy to offer shaded seats, increased video displays, and improved luxury seating and hospitality options.

Inspired by a 60 Minutes special on plastic pollution, Garfinkel created an internal committee ahead of Super Bowl LIV that formulated a strategy to phase out 99.4% of single-use plastics. The efforts help eliminate more than 2.8 million plastic items annually. With fans and employees hesitant to attend in-person events in 2020, Garfinkel helped lead efforts to make Hard Rock Stadium the first public facility to receive GBAC STAR™ accreditation. He worked with members of the Global Biorisk Advisory Council (GBAC) to develop a 20-step plan that established a gold standard for facilities to implement different infectious disease prevention work practices.

Garfinkel and Dolphins owner Stephen Ross also spearheaded efforts to construct the team’s new $135 million Baptist Health Training Complex, which was completed in 2021.

In August 2024, Garfinkel stepped down as CEO after 13 years.

== Honors and awards ==
The Dolphins were named to the 2019 and 2020 Best Employers in Sports List by Front Office Sports, which recognizes organizations across the sports industry that are doing the best for their employees.

In October 2020, Garfinkel earned the George Norlin Award, which recognizes outstanding CU Boulder alumni who have demonstrated a commitment to excellence in their chosen field of endeavor and a devotion to the betterment of society and their community.

Garfinkel and the Dolphins were honored by the Fritz Pollard Alliance at Super Bowl LIV with the Paul J. Tagliabue Award for their commitment to advancing diversity in leadership positions throughout the organization.

In March 2021, Garfinkel and Ross were among Sports Business Journal’s Leaders in Diversity and Inclusive Hiring honorees for their efforts to advance the sports business careers of women, people of color and members of the LGBTQ+ community.

Garfinkel also serves on the board of Dolphins Challenge Cancer, the National Football Foundation and the Sports Management Advisory Board and Ross School of Business Advisory Board at the University of Michigan.
