= Steven J. Hatchell =

American sports administrator (born 20th century)

- Born: 1950 (age 75–76)
- Education: University of Colorado Boulder (BA)
- Occupation: Sports administrator
- Known for: President and CEO of the National Football Foundation
- Awards: Francis "Reds" Bagnell Award (2024)

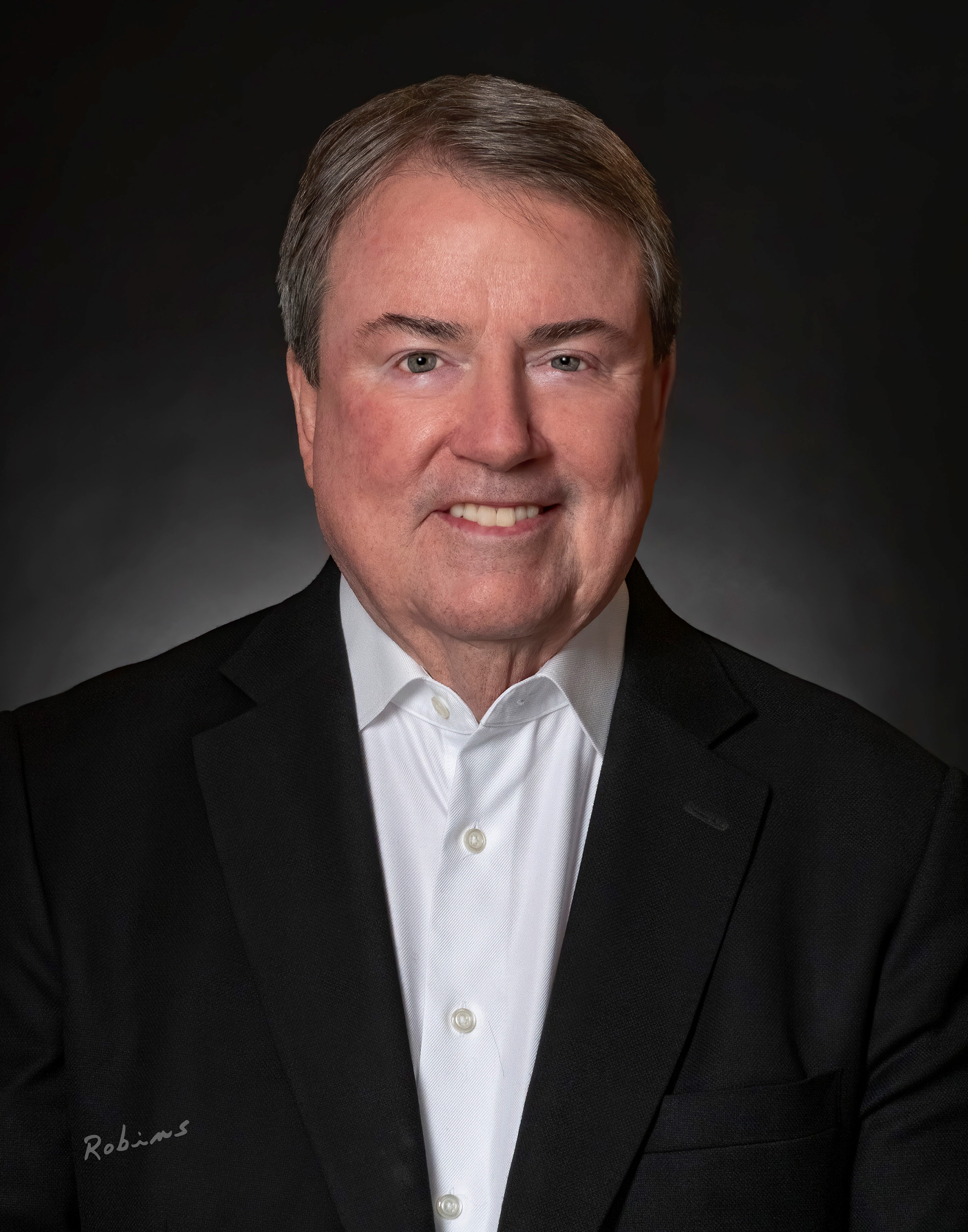
Steven J. Hatchell (2022)

Steven J. Hatchell (born 20th century) is an American sports administrator who serves as the president and chief executive officer of the National Football Foundation (NFF) and College Hall of Fame, Inc., which operates the College Football Hall of Fame in Atlanta.

== Early life and education ==
Hatchell graduated from University of Colorado Boulder with a journalism degree in 1970, and he was inducted into the CU Athletic Hall of Fame in 2017.

== Career ==
Hatchell joined the NFF after serving for six years as the commissioner of the Professional Rodeo Cowboys Association (PRCA). Prior to the PRCA, he served as the first commissioner of the Big 12 Conference in Dallas, an entity he helped establish in 1995. While with the Big 12, he played a key role in negotiating the television contracts and bowl-game formula for the conference. During his time at the Big 12, he also served as the chairman of the Power of One, a National Collegiate Athletic Association (NCAA) promotional initiative to combine the marketing resources of collegiate sports into a unified force and led the Bowl Alliance as its chairman for six years.

From 1987 to 1993, Hatchell headed the Orange Bowl as its executive director, landing Federal Express (now FedEx) as its title sponsor. He was director of sports information for Colorado State University from 1976 to 1977 before leaving to become an associate commissioner of the Big Eight Conference, where he served from 1977 to 1983. While at the Big Eight, he served as interim commissioner between commissioners. He left to become the commissioner of the Metropolitan Collegiate Athletic Conference, a post he held from 1983 to 1987. After his time at the Orange Bowl in 1993, he began a two-year stint as the commissioner of the Southwest Conference.

Hatchell has served on several United States Olympic Committee boards and as part of the staff for three Olympic Games. He served on the board of Catholic Campus Ministries from 2000 to 2005 and was also information director for the Rocky Mountain Intercollegiate Ski Association (RMISA) and on the board of directors for the Doral Ryder Open in Miami. Hatchell chaired the 13th Annual Bishop’s Gala for Catholic Charities of Dallas on January 22, 2011. He served on the Development Steering Committee for Special Olympics of Texas.

=== Accolades ===
The Football Writers Association of America (FWAA) named him as the 2015 recipient of the FWAA Bert McGrane Award for his contributions to the coverage of college football, and the National Association of Collegiate Directors of Athletics (NACDA) presented him a Golden Anniversary Award in 2015, recognizing his impact on NACDA over its first fifty years. College Sports Communicators (CSC and formerly known as CoSIDA) inducted him into the organization's Hall of Fame in 2018. A four-time letter winner at Colorado, Hatchell received the Honorary C Club Award in 1983 and was recognized as a CU Living Legend recipient in 2021.

Hatchell has been honored numerous times for his leadership. Pop Warner Little Scholars presented him with the Warner Award in 2014 as an individual who has achieved excellence in athletics, scholarship and life's endeavors with integrity and humanity. In 2022, Hatchell was honored as a 2022 Father of the Year in Dallas, and the National Football Foundation named its top high school team academic award as "The Hatchell Cup" in his honor.

In 2023, Hatchell added the Bowl Season Leadership Hall of Fame to his accolades. While at the Orange Bowl, Hatchell served as the chairman of the Bowl Season, which was formerly known as the Football Bowl Association, for five years. In 2024, the Maxwell Football Club presented Hatchell with the club's Francis "Reds" Bagnell Award for contributions to football, and the University of Colorado presented him the school’s inaugural Ski Team Champions Award.

In October 2026, Hatchell was named a recipient of the National Football Foundation's 2026 Gold Medal, the organization's highest honor, recognizing his more than five decades of leadership and contributions to college football.

== Personal life ==
His wife, Patty, of 49 years died in 2021. They have two sons, Matthew and Jonathan. He has two grandchildren, Reva and Booker, through Matthew and his wife, Wendy.

== See also ==
- List of Colorado State University people
- List of people from Dallas
- List of people from Florida
- List of University of Colorado Boulder alumni
