= Temple Painter =

American harpsichordist (1933–2016)

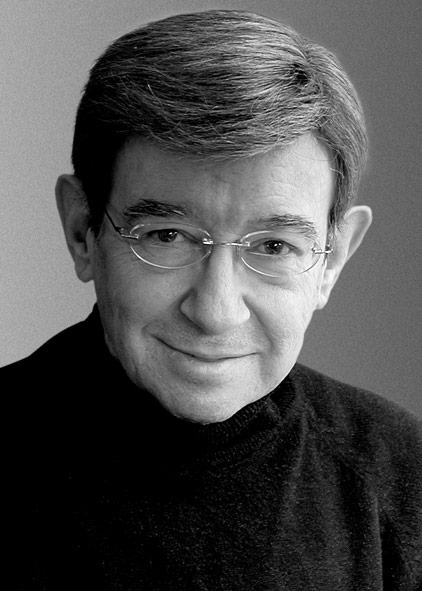
- Temple Painter 2002 Photograph by Elliot Hoffman

Background information
- Born: June 14, 1933; Pulaski, Virginia, U.S.
- Died: August 6, 2016 (aged 83) Philadelphia, Pennsylvania, U.S.
- Occupation: Organist
- Instruments: Organ, harp, piano

Temple Painter (June 14, 1933 – August 6, 2016) was an American harpsichordist and organist.

He was born in 1933 in Pulaski, Virginia.

Temple Painter performed as solo organist with members of the New York Philharmonic at Lincoln Center under Hermann Scherchen, as harpsichord soloist with the Philadelphia Orchestra under Eugene Ormandy, and as solo harpsichordist for the St. Paul Chamber Orchestra. He performed as solo pianist, harpsichordist and organist with the Chamber Orchestra of Philadelphia, and concertized extensively in the United States, Europe and Israel.

His 1962 critically acclaimed recording "Temple Painter-Harpsichord Recital" on the Artia-Parliament label was cited by The New York Times in 1964 as "the most satisfying" of the five harpsichord recordings reviewed that year. He also recorded the harpsichord music of American composer Harold Boatrite and can be heard as harpsichord soloist and continuo player in Handel's "Roman Vespers" recorded by the Philadelphia Singers and the Chamber Orchestra of Philadelphia on RCA Red Seal Records.

Painter was a graduate of the Curtis Institute of Music and the recipient of several honors and awards, including the Martha Baird Rockefeller Grant and an honorary doctorate from the Combs College of Music. In addition, he was a National Arts Associate of the Sigma Alpha Iota International Music Fraternity.

He was for 40 years the permanent harpsichordist for the Chamber Orchestra of Philadelphia, and for 45 years the organist at Congregation Adath Jeshurun, Elkins Park, Pennsylvania. Additionally, he was associate professor of music at Haverford College for 13 years, and was lecturer in music at both Immaculata University and Temple University. One of his students at Haverford was Robert Sataloff.

Temple Painter's recording of the Two- and Three-part Inventions of Johann Sebastian Bach was unfinished at the time of his death.

He died at Hahnemann University Hospital, Philadelphia, on August 6, 2016, aged 83.
