= Matt Larson =

American computer programmer

- Education: University of Colorado Colorado Springs
- Occupations: Founder & CEO of Confio Software

Matt Larson is an American entrepreneur who founded and was CEO of Confio Software. Larson is a co-founder of the non-profit Guardian of Angels Foundation based in Denver, Colorado. He is the co-author of several books on technology.

== Education ==
Matt Larson earned a Bachelor of Science from the University of Colorado Colorado Springs in Business Administration. He graduated first in his class and is a member of the Mensa Society.

== Professional career ==
Larson began his career as an intern at Oracle Corporation, the computer technology company, after his graduation from the University of Colorado Boulder. In 2002, after a brief time working in the oil and gas industry, Larson founded Confio Software. Confio was a Boulder, Colorado-based software company that “develops database performance solution for DBAs, IT managers, and database developers, for both physical and virtual server environments.”. In 2013 Confio Software was acquired by SolarWinds Inc.

In 2008, Larson also launched, and briefly ran, a small private equity company.

== Philanthropy ==
Larson is the co-founder of Guardian of Angels with his wife, Melanie Larson. The private, non-profit foundation is based in Denver, Colorado and focuses on reducing the "incidence of child sexual abuse." Larson and his wife are also partners in Social Venture Partners, a community of investors who donate funds to non-profit organizations.

== Awards and recognition ==
In 2013, Ernst & Young named Matt Larson a regional finalist for its “Entrepreneur of the Year” award.
