= Christopher Sorensen =

- Born: October 1, 1947 (age 79); Omaha, Nebraska
- Education: University of Nebraska–Lincoln; University of Colorado
- Known for: Research with particulate systems,
- Awards: Carnegie Foundation and Council for Advancement and Support of Education United States Professor of the Year for doctoral and research universities (2007) In 2026 Sorensen received The Fuchs Memorial Award, the premier international honor in aerosol science.
- Scientific career
- Fields: Aerosol physics Light scattering Soft matter physics
- Workplaces: Kansas State University
- Doctoral advisor: W.J. O'Sullivan

Christopher Sorensen (born October 1, 1947) is the Cortelyou-Rust University Distinguished Professor and a University Distinguished Teaching Scholar in the Kansas State University Physics Department. He also is an adjunct professor in the department of chemistry at Kansas State University. He was named the Carnegie Foundation and Council for Advancement and Support of Education United States Professor of the Year for doctoral and research universities in 2007. His research interests include materials synthesis including graphene materials, light scattering, particulate systems, and soft matter physics.

== Biography ==
Sorensen was born in Omaha, Nebraska. He earned a Bachelor of Science in physics from the University of Nebraska–Lincoln in 1969. He was drafted and served in Vietnam in military intelligence. He earned his Ph.D. in physics in 1977 from the University of Colorado. He joined the physics department at Kansas State University in 1977 as an assistant professor of physics; he was promoted to associate professor in 1982 and professor in 1986. He was named a university distinguished professor in 2000 and the Cortelyou-Rust University Distinguished Professor in 2009. He is also a University Distinguished Teaching Scholar at Kansas State University.

== Research ==
Sorensen's research focuses on graphene materials synthesis via an explosion/detonation method he invented. He also performs experimental and theoretical studies of light scattering by particles of arbitrary size and shape and aggregation and gelation kinetics in aerosols and colloids. He is the author of more than 300 papers and holds seven patents including a method for graphene synthesis. He has directed the research of 20 master's recipients, 21 doctorate recipients, and 11 postdoctoral students. In 2007-2008 he served as president of the American Association for Aerosol Research. He is a fellow of the American Association for Aerosol Research, the American Association for the Advancement of Science, and the American Physical Society. He performs extensive outreach activities.

== Awards and honors ==
- Phi Beta Kappa (1969)
- Woodrow Wilson Fellow (1969)
- David Sinclair Senior Scientist Award, American Assoc. for Aerosol Research (2003)
- Carnegie/CASE National Professor of the Year for Doctoral Universities (2007)
- George Norlin Distinguished Alumnus Award, University of Colorado (2008)
- Olin Petefish Award in Basic Science, Higuchi-KU Endowment Award (2008)
- Outstanding Publication Award of the American Association for Aerosol Research, Aerosol Science and Technology (2019)
