= Frank Wilson (journalist) =

American journalist

Francis R. Wilson (born 1941) is an American columnist, poet and retired American book review editor to The Philadelphia Inquirer, a position in which he served for 28 years, before leaving in 2008. While working at the Inquirer, Wilson published a weekly "Editor's Choice" each Sunday in the books section.

He authors a blog at Books, Inq., where he publishes his poetry, book reviews, and other writings. In 2009, Wilson's blog was selected as one of the Sunday Times' Top 100 Blogs. In 2019, Cynthia Haven's Blog for the written word, a blog site for Stanford University, tagged Wilson on the first day of Advent, saying "is there any other poem to commemorate the day? I had to look no further than...the blog of Frank Wilson," adding one of his poems .

Wilson started writing book reviews for the Inquirer and The New York Times in 1976; he was officially hired at the Inquirer in 1980 as an editorial assistant. Wilson is a graduate from Saint Joseph's College, known now, as Saint Joseph's University. He currently resides in Philadelphia, Pennsylvania, with his wife Deborah.

== Background and education ==
Wilson is a graduate of Saint Joseph's College, now Saint Joseph's University. His education, consisted of, what he referred to as "a healthy dose of classical education, Latin, Greek, Philosophy and four years of Theology." In October 1964, he published his first professional review for the Intercollegiate Studies Institute

After leaving college, he went to work as an editor at Arms Control and Disarmament, for a short time, before attending graduate school at Penn State. He only stayed for a semester, before leaving to attend the University of Dayton. He left the university in Dayton before graduating, deciding to work instead.

== Career ==
Wilson worked at a number of different positions in his early career. He was a book editor for two publication companies, Fortress Press and J.B. Lippincott, and as an art gallery director; he worked as a columnist at the weekly Philadelphia, which is no longer in business.

Wilson finally took a job as the office manager for a construction company, having the need for a job that supported a family, after getting married and having children. In 1976, he started writing as a freelance, for The Philadelphia Inquirer and The New York Times. Four years later, he began working, full-time at the Inquirer, beginning as an editorial assistant and promoted to the copy desk.

In 2002, the Inquirer, in negotiations with their parent company, Knight Ridder, initiated a second round of budget cuts, and moved the Sunday book coverage to the arts and entertainment section. Wilson, in an interview with the American Booksellers Association, acknowledged the changes saying the book section "was reduced from a six-page stand-alone section to a four-page stand-alone section in 2000, followed by a cut to two pages in 2001 and one page in March of 2002." Wilson, along with many others, were unhappy about another round of cuts, saying "why wouldn't a newspaper want to cater to people who read?" He acknowledged that in business decisions, everyone won't be happy, and added that they would continue to publish eight reviews a week.

Finally, Wilson made the decision to retire from the Inquirer, after having spent 28-years with the news organization, citing disagreements with leadership, and not wanting to "go along to get along" anymore. He was editor for the book section from 2000 until leaving in 2008.
