= Joan Moment =

American artist (born 1938)

- Born: 1938 (age 87–88); Sellersville, Pennsylvania, US
- Education: University of Colorado, Boulder, University of Connecticut, Yale School of Nursing
- Known for: Painting, mixed media, painted reliefs
- Spouse: David M. Roth
- Awards: Rockefeller Foundation
- Website: Joan Moment

Joan Moment, Heavenly Bodies Surrounded by Notables, acrylic, latex enamel and gauze on canvas, 72" x 84", 1983.

Joan Moment (born 1938) is an American painter based in Northern California. She emerged from the 1960s Northern California Funk art movement and gained attention when the Whitney Museum of American Art Curator Marcia Tucker selected her for the 1973 Biennial and for a solo exhibition at the Whitney in 1974. Moment is known for process-oriented paintings that employ non-traditional materials and techniques evoking vital energies (biological, sexual, cosmic) conveyed through archetypal iconography. Though briefly aligned with Funk—which was often defined by ribald humor and irreverence toward art-world pretensions—her work diverged by the mid-1970s, fusing abstraction and figuration in paintings that writers compared to prehistoric and tribal art. Critic Victoria Dalkey wrote that Moment's methods combined chance and improvisation to address "forces embodied in a universe too large for us to comprehend, as well as the ... fragility and transience of the material world."

In addition to the Whitney, Moment has exhibited at the Oakland Museum, Crocker Art Museum and Long Beach Museum of Art. Her work belongs to the public art collections of the Crocker and Oakland Museums, the Manetti Shrem Museum of Art, and the City of Sacramento, among others. She lives in Sacramento and is professor emerita at California State University, Sacramento.

== Early life and career ==
Moment was born in rural Sellersville, Pennsylvania, in 1938, and raised in Fairfield, Connecticut. She earned BS and RN degrees from the University of Connecticut (at Yale Medical Center), where, after graduating in 1960, she worked as a psychiatric and public health RN. Writers have connected her medical experience to the biological undercurrents in her art. In the mid-1960s, her mother's untimely death from illness and the physical suffering she witnessed as a nurse convinced Moment to leave that career for art school. The metaphysical questions provoked by those experiences found voice in Burial (1966), a pivotal, Funk-inspired work consisting of a doll in an open suitcase surrounded by radio tubes, plastic cookie cutters and personal ephemera; it marked Moment's passage into a new phase of her life. She earned an MFA at the University of Colorado Boulder (1970), studying under Funk artist William T. Wiley and painter and sculptor Roland Reiss. There, she produced work with unconventional materials (horse manure, cheesecloth, household objects) that explored personal fears and experiences.

In 1970, Moment accepted a teaching position at California State University, Sacramento (CSUS), where she taught sculpture, painting and art history until retiring in 2004. She also began exhibiting in Northern California, participating in group shows at the San Francisco Art Institute, the Oakland Museum and the Crocker Art Museum (including the international traveling show, "Sacramento Sampler," 1972). These exhibitions preceded her inclusion in the 1973 Whitney Biennial and a solo exhibition there in 1974. Over the next decade, her work appeared in solo exhibition at the Crocker (1981) and in group shows at Los Angeles Contemporary Exhibitions (L.A.C.E), Long Beach Museum of Art, and San Jose Museum of Art, among other institutions. During that period, she lived bi-coastally in Sacramento and Manhattan before returning to Sacramento in 1993.

== Work ==
Critics have described Moment's painting—spanning mixed media works on paper to wall installations—as "aggressively process-oriented," physically immediate, and enduring in its reliance on the natural world as a formal source, despite continual stylistic evolution. Mark Van Proyen and other critics have linked her art to the "spiritual abstraction" of early modernists such as Kandinsky, Malevich and Mondrian, who sought to convey metaphysical ideas and omnipresent cosmic and transcendent energies.

Joan Moment, Haloed Condom Relief Piece, acrylic, rubber latex, neoprene, gauze and condoms, 83.5" x 60", 1972.

Moment has worked with varied materials ranging from early mixed media quilts made of cut-up balloons to reliefs made of painted neoprene rubber embedded with layers of gauze or rubber latex. She has also made paintings on vellum, canvas, paper and wood. Methods that she has employed include assemblage, imprinting with found objects or her hands, and "flow painting"—pouring thinned acrylic paint in ways that mimic natural processes, such as flooding, erosion, volcanic activity or cosmic phenomena. Her paintings often rely on the repetition of primordial forms (abstract and referential) in unpredictable arrangements of rich patterning and spontaneous rhythm. Mortality, sexuality, transformation and spirituality have been frequent themes, which she explores using interconnected visual metaphors ranging from the macrocosmic (planets or galaxies) to the microscopic (cells or molecules).

=== Early painting series (1970–1986) ===
Moment's early series drew on Funk, the postminimalism of Eva Hesse, and tribal art forms, fusing intuitive aspects of contemporary abstraction to the immediacy and directness of naïve art. This work explored and subverted outsider art and "women's work" traditions such as quilting and sewing through unconventional, often irreverent constructions (balloon quilts, latex dresses), sexual references and iconic imagery. The "Condom Relief Series" (1970–2) examined sexuality and the vulnerability and physicality of the body through a feminist lens, drawing responses ranging from amusement to shock. These pieces, fabricated out of cheesecloth, gauze, rubber latex and condoms, combined chance occurrences, warped modernist grids and obsessive dot patterning akin to that seen in Australian Aborigine bark paintings and African clay vessels. Haloed Condom Relief Piece (1972) employed wiggling networks of condoms applied to a black neoprene ground, surrounded by and painted over with bright colored haloes and dots. Writing in Squarecylinder, Julia Couzens likened their "relentless motion" to writhing "primordial amoebas."

Joan Moment, Waterfall, acrylic on watercolor board, 23" x 18", 1973.

In the mid-1970s, Moment turned to archetypal symbols and forms found in Paleolithic objects, aboriginal and ancient art, and Byzantine mosaics. The "Dotted Mosaic Paintings" (1973–1975) depicted flat, deadpan, iconic forms—animals, fish, plants, people, tropical landscapes and mountains—composed in vibrating, bright dots of color on black rubberized grounds (e.g., Waterfall, 1973). Marcia Tucker described them as "haunting forgotten Edens" that offered "a keyhole view of paradise, a still and magical world that seduces, enchants, and captivates with eccentric, impossible delights." In the "Pattern Paintings" (1978–84), Moment painted crudely rendered geometric shapes on gesso-treated cheesecloth, dresses and chairs—rejecting the conventional square or rectilinear painting format (e.g., Shirt Totem or Rug Dress, 1978). Their textured surfaces, covered in checkerboard, gridded, concentric or dotted patterns, referenced contemporary concerns with camouflage, aboriginal art, superficiality and the masking power of clothing (Cocktail Dress, 1978).

In the "Columnar/Planetary" and "Neolithic" series (1983–1986), Moment shifted from holistic, iconic compositions to arrangements of floating and stacked Ionic columns, cosmic spirals, and biomorphic, genital-like forms, which blurred surface and image. She painted these works thickly, investing them with a cartoon-like sexuality whose rawness and energy reviewers compared to outsider art and paintings by Philip Guston and Jean Dubuffet. Mark Van Proyen compared the "mytho-erotic imagery" and "biophiliac vitalism" of the Neolithic series to Paleolithic ritual objects, tantric manuscripts and the stone-cut entangled erotic figures of Hindu temples. Paintings from these series employed understated color and crowded arrangements of crude, gestural open-ended forms resembling prehistoric representations of male and female genitalia, teeth, hearts and phalli. Paint-saturated layers suggested surfaces of interconnected living tissue or atmospheric, mythic spaces. Christopher French connected some of these gridded works formally and symbolically to Moment's condom paintings, with archetypal Venus of Willendorf-like forms serving as feminine counterparts to the earlier phallic imagery.

=== Later painting (1987–present) ===
In her later work, Moment has increasingly focused on forms that evoke natural and cosmic phenomena, delineating themes of mortality, temporality and memory, while continuing to experiment with new materials and techniques. The "Nature/Cosmology" series (1987–92), built on earlier stacked stones or seeds, employed pile-ups of watery, brightly colored ovals that she painted, rubbed and erased over creamy grounds on vellum (e.g., Wall, 1986; Treasure, 1989). After reading Pablo Neruda's Stones of the Sky, she turned to other primordial forms (seeds, stones or boulders, pods, eggs, bubbles, gems, sunflowers), which she portrayed in flat and deep space, evoking emotional and spiritual states.

Joan Moment, Galaxy VII, acrylic on canvas, 6' x 8', 2020.

In the early 1990s, Moment began to eschew the brush, painting with her hands and fingers and imprinting with paint-daubed leaves. In doing so, she bridged the gap between sources and imagery in ways that resembled Neolithic cave painting, Abstract Expressionism and the "anthropometries" (body prints) of Yves Klein ("Imprinted Paintings," 1993–2002). In the "Hand" works, cascades of palms and splattered, runny paint accrued thickly, often blurring the boundary between subject and ground. Peter Frank described them as visceral, sometimes painful works of anguished human presence addressing loss, genocide and the AIDS epidemic. The "Garden Fresco" and "Red Nasturtium" series were controlled, contemplative compositions that critics compared to botanical or Thoreau-like, poetic observations of nature. The built-up leaf imprints, worked onto surfaces with both delicacy and force, range from realistic records to ghostly auras, combining in rhythmic, all-over compositions.

Beginning in the early 2000s, Moment turned to what Peter Frank called "flow painting"—pouring, dragging and puddling thin paint to produce fresco-like grounds suggestive of cosmic gases, tidal eddies, flood plains, lava flows and deserts seen from above. In the abstract "Universe" series (2002– ), Moment overlaid these grounds with imprinted circular forms of different sizes that were rhythmically stamped, scraped, blotted and allowed to run, creating active, tactile surfaces. Maria Porges wrote that this later work moves toward a "transcendence of the specificity of the human body," often suggesting the deep time of outer space and inconceivable distances (e.g., Endlessness, 2009). The paintings have taken several directions, sometimes in tandem: configurations of interlocking, cascading or clustered circles suggesting cells, bubbles and chemical diagrams (e.g., Looking Through the Yellow Sea of Blue Moons, 2004); forms akin to islands (Archipelago, 2005) or those seen in Native American dreamcatchers; and evocations of the skies, with orbs and spattered circles that call to mind star constellations, planets or galaxies (Star Map II, 2005).

Reviewers of Moment's solo exhibitions between 2006 and 2013 increasingly commented on how the artist complicated the experience of distance, scale and space. They noted how oscillations between ground and surface, aerial and terrestrial perspectives, and macrocosmic and microscopic views evoked a sense of interrelatedness (e.g., Jiggling Polarities, 2010; Night Waves, 2013). David Olivant, writing in Squarecylinder, described the paintings as "highly personalized maps of the universe" that sought "to register [the] fleeting, almost incomprehensible reality" that "we exist outside of time and space." San Francisco Chronicle critic Kenneth Baker suggested that the work corresponded to the mental postures, crude models and intuitions of feeling with which we face "ultimate realities."

== Collections, awards and public art commissions ==
Moment's work belongs to the public collections of universities, corporations and museums, including the Allen Memorial Art Museum; California State University, Sacramento; Crocker Art Museum; Hallie Ford Museum of Art; Manetti Shrem Museum of Art; and Oakland Museum of Art, among others. She has received artist-in-residence awards sponsored by the Rockefeller Foundation (1984).

Between 1993 and 2011, Moment created six public art projects. They include A Fragment of the Universe (2011), a 12 ft × 18 ft glass tesserae mosaic located at the Sacramento International Airport; Inside and Outside (1998), a 8 ft × 12 ft phototransfer collage for the Wastewater Collection Building in Sacramento; and Sunflower (1989), a 6 ft × 7 ft painting at the Carol Miller Justice Center. All were commissioned by the Sacramento Metropolitan Arts Commission. Moment also created public works for the University of California, Davis Medical Center (2010) and California State University (2003), and two paintings for American River College's Science and Design building (2013).
