= Romeo Cascarino =

American composer (1922-2002)

Romeo Cascarino (September 28, 1922, Philadelphia – January 8, 2002, Norristown) was an American classical music composer.

== Biography ==
Cascarino was born in Philadelphia on September 28, 1922 and graduated from South Philadelphia High School in June 1941. He served for many years as professor of music at the now-defunct Combs College of Music in Philadelphia. He received Guggenheim Fellowships in 1948 and 1949. His 1948 piece Prospice was inspired by Robert Browning's poem of the same name. Pygmalion (1954) was based on the Greek myth and premiered in 1957 by the Royal Philharmonic. It also premiered as a ballet in 1957 at the Philadelphia Civic Ballet.

His music is generally tonal, and his magnum opus is the opera William Penn, whose life had fascinated Cascarino since childhood. The opera took him nearly 25 years to compose, from 1950 to 1975, and it premiered in 1982 at the Academy of Music in Philadelphia with John Cheek of the Metropolitan Opera in the title role. The work evolved from two earlier choral pieces, Prayer for Philadelphia (1950) and The Treaty (1953) with dramatic revisions into the early 1970s. The Acadian Land (1960) developed from an earlier piece, Divertimento, composed in 1953 and scored for woodwinds, harp, strings, percussion and celeste.

CDs of his music, including The Acadian Land and Portrait of Galatea, have been released on Naxos and feature his Orchestral and Chamber Works with JoAnn Falletta conducting. Blades of Grass, for English Horn and String Orchestra, was recorded on Innova with Orchestra 2001 conducted by James Freeman. His works have been played by the Philadelphia Orchestra, the New Orleans Philharmonic, the Royal Philharmonic of London and the Nord Deutsches Symphony. His ballets Pygmalion and Prospice were mounted in Philadelphia and New York. In 1961, he arranged and conducted Pieces for Piano and Orchestra, recorded in the cine Citta studios in Rome, Italy. From 1950 to 1957, he was musical director of the Co-opera Company, giving performances of rarely-heard operas in English, the translations often done by Cascarino himself.

Cascarino's 1984 Transcription for String Orchestra was motifs from Bach's Adagio and Fugue, Violin Sonata 1 in G minor, BWV 1001. His 2000 string and chamber orchestra pieces Meditation and Elegy were inspired by Edgar Allan Poe's Annabel Lee. It was composed for Strings in 2000 based on material from 1935 and 1937.

Cascarino died in Norristown, Pennsylvania on January 8, 2002.

== Selected works ==
- Spring Pastorale (1941) - full orchestra
- Epitaph for a Soldier (1942-1943) - full orchestra
- Blades of Grace (1945) - string and chamber orchestra
- Prospice (1948) - full orchestra
- Portrait of Galatea (1950) - full orchestra
- Pygmalion (1954) - full orchestra
  - Premiered in 1957 by the Royal Philharmonic (conductor: Ferdinand Liva)
  - Premiered as a ballet in 1957 at the Philadelphia Civic Ballet (choreographer: Norman Craig)
- William Penn (opera in three acts; 1955-1965) - full orchestra, soloists and chorus
  - Premiered at the Philadelphia Academy of Music in 1982
- The Acadian Land (1960) - full orchestra
  - Winner of the Arthur Benjamin Tranquil Music Award, New Orleans Philharmonic (1960)
- Recollections of My Boyhood (1977) - suite for chamber orchestra
- Transcription for String Orchestra (1984) - string and chamber orchestra
- Meditation (2000) - string and chamber orchestra
- Elegy (2000) - string and chamber orchestra
