= Keith Dale Gordon =

American composer (born 1966)

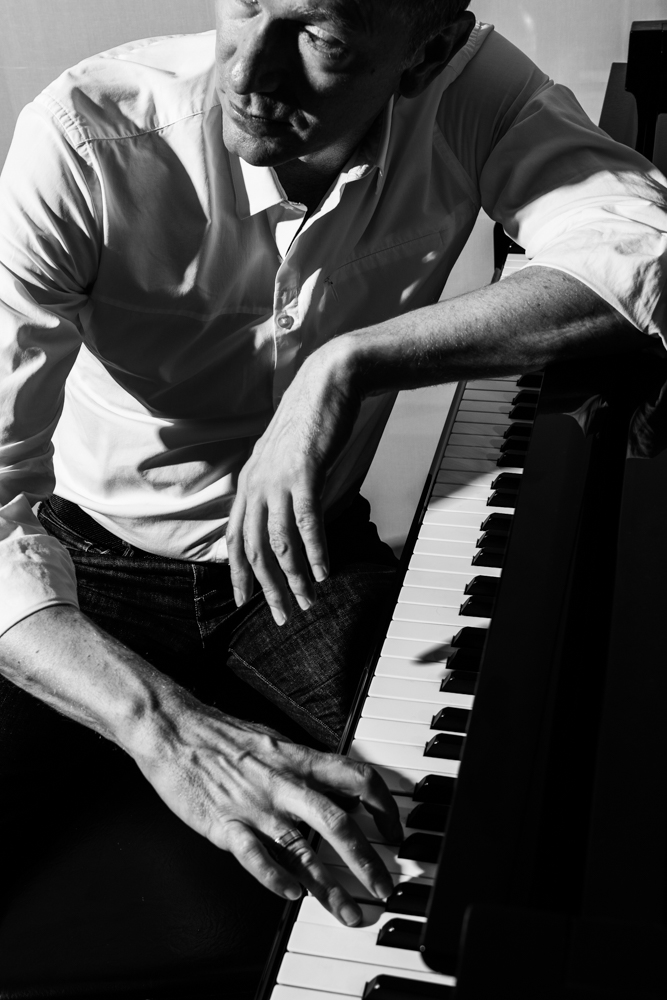
- Keith Dale Gordon, July 2018
- Born: Keith Dale Gordon; July 14, 1966 (age 60)
- Education: University of Colorado
- Occupation: Composer
- Known for: Musical theatre

Keith Dale Gordon (born July 14, 1966), is an American lyricist and composer of musical theater, commercial jingles, and award shows. He is known primarily for his 2006 musical Saint Heaven which Gordon co-wrote with Martin Casella. He also is known for his musical adaptation of Camille DeAngelis' 2007 novel Mary Modern and lyrical setting of Karel Jaromir Erben's poem The Wedding Night.

== Early life and education ==
Gordon was born in Denver, Colorado on July 14, 1966, to Grace and Donald Gordon and began studying piano at the age of seven. Gordon graduated from Thomas Jefferson High School in 1984. He studied piano and developed under the direction of numerous notable teachers and performers such as Lucia Clarke, Jane Tirey, and Helen Walker-Hill. In interviews, Gordon emphasizes the significance of his time at the University of Colorado Boulder College of Music with Argentine composer Luis Jorge Gonzalez as being a key period for his formative compositional direction. He earned his Bachelor of Music in Piano Performance and Composition during this time. Gordon is an alum of the BMI Lehman Engel Musical Theatre Workshop, where he further developed under the direction of Maury Yeston, Skip Kennon, and Richard Engquist.

== Career ==
Gordon's professional career began in 1989 writing jingles at Lotas Minard Patton McIver in New York City. A number of his jingles underscored national ad campaigns for Nutrisystem, Muscular Dystrophy Association, Max Factor, Tinkerbell Cosmetics, Redbook, Fitness, Cosmopolitan, and CosmoGirl. During this time Gordon was also composing songs and choral work for recording artists JoJo David, Adam Birnbaum, and Anne Marie David among others. While his professional accomplishments gained momentum commercially, he was also developing musical theater work during this time.

Gordon began attracting critical interest around 2006, when Saint Heaven premiered at the Stamford Center for the Performing Arts Rich Forum. The musical was directed by Matt Lenz. Notable actors who had previously won, or would go on to be nominated for, Tony Awards such as Chuck Cooper and Montego Glover starred in the production. Saint Heaven's sets were designed by Hamilton's David Korins. In 2011, Gordon's The Shadow Sparrow was performed at the O'Neill National Musical Theater Conference. According to a recent interview with Gordon, his current collaboration with Martin Casella, a musical adaptation of Camille DeAngelis' novel Mary Modern, is in development and will likely be produced soon.

== Selected theater works ==
Year	Title	Music	Lyrics	Book	Ref.
2021	Mary Modern	Keith Gordon		Martin Casella	
2017	The Wedding Night	Stephen Coleman	Keith Gordon	Jana Hejduková	
2015	Sadako & Floyd	Keith Gordon			
2014	Girl Powers	Keith Gordon		Michele Aldin-Kushner	
2011	The Shadow Sparrow	Keith Gordon	Charlie Sohne	Anton Dudley	
2006	Saint Heaven	Keith Gordon		Martin Casella	

== Songs and choral works ==
Year	Song title	Artist	Publisher	Ref.
Year	Colors	JoJo David & Adam Birnbaum	Arrhae Press	
Year	Think of Me First	Bayie	Atlantic	
Year	Born to Lead	The Valli Girls	Sony/BMG	
Year	Fill My Mouth with Your Words	Anne Marie David	Arrhae Press	
Year	Mass for Saint Timothy's	Unknown	Unknown	
Year	It Must Have Been	Unknown	Unknown	

== Awards ==
- 2017 Pick of the Fringe, The Hollywood Fringe Festival - The Wedding Night
- 2014 The Santa Fe Musical Theatre Festival - Girl Powers
- 2012 City Theater of Pittsburg Momentum Festival - The Shadow Sparrow
- 2011 The O’Neill National Musical Theater Conference - The Shadow Sparrow
- 2008 Dixon Place Festival - Girl Powers
- 2006 NYMF Director’s Choice Award - Saint Heaven
- 2005 TRU Best of Festival Award - Saint Heaven
