= Heidi Browning =

American corporate executive

- Occupation: Chief Marketing Officer
- Years active: 2016–present
- Organization: National Hockey League

Heidi Browning is an American corporate executive, currently working as chief digital officer of the National Hockey League. She was named the fourth most powerful woman in hockey in 2020 by Sportsnet and to Forbes' 30 Most Powerful Women In U.S. Sports 2018. A University of Colorado Boulder graduate, she previously worked as an executive at Universal McCann and Pandora.
