= Combs College of Music =

Music conservatory in Philadelphia

Combs College of Music was a former music school founded in Philadelphia, Pennsylvania, United States, in 1885 as Combs Broad Street Conservatory of Music by Gilbert Raynolds Combs, celebrated pianist, organist and composer. It closed in 1990.

== History ==
The faculty included famous musicians such as Leopold Godowsky, Hugh Archibald Clark and Henry Schradieck. In 1908 the college was chartered to grant academic degrees in music. The name of the college was changed in 1933 to Combs College of Music. Combs was the first music college to have dormitories and foreign students. In 1954, Helen Behr Braun, a graduate of Combs Broad Street Conservatory and a concert violinist, succeeded to the Presidency. Under her direction an impressive faculty was assembled which included Jean Casadesus, Leo Ornstein, Philadelphia Orchestra members Jacob Krachmalnick, Carl Torello and William Kincaid, musicologist Guy Marriner and composer Romeo Cascarino.

A partial list of notable faculty during the 1970s and 80s also included the duo-piano team of Toni and Rosi Grunschlag, performers and pedagogues Jacob Neupauer, Michael Guerra, Donald Reinhardt, Anthony Weigand, Romeo Cascarino, Dolores Ferraro, Frank Versaci, Joseph Primavera, Keith Chapman, Morton Berger, Howard Haines, William Fabrizio and John McIntyre. As early as 1954 Helen Braun was exploring the use of music as a therapy. The college engaged in many early research projects; one sponsored by the Rudolf Steiner Foundation, which sent distinguished composer and Combs alumnus Paul Nordoff to England and Scotland to study the use of music for special needs children. Together with Clive Robbins, he pioneered a unique program of music therapy, widely recognized for its innovative and effective results. With Nordoff's teachings as a foundation, Combs was the first college in the Philadelphia area to offer an educational program in Music Therapy. Many of the leading practitioners in that field received their degrees from Combs.(see notable alumni below)

The college moved from Center City to the city's West Mount Airy neighborhood and occupying many houses in the Pelham section in 1964, expanding the campus and adding dormitories. In 1984, the college relocated again to a new-38-acre (150,000 m^{2}) campus in Radnor, Pennsylvania. Just prior to this move, Combs' Head of Composition and Composer in Residence Romeo Cascarino's opera William Penn attracted international attention. Sponsored by the college and the William Penn Opera Committee in cooperation with the Century IV Celebration, it was successfully mounted and performed at Philadelphia's prestigious Academy of Music in 1982.

The college moved back to Philadelphia in 1987 to the campus of Spring Garden College. During the economic climate of those years, Combs College of Music, like so many small private institutions, experienced financial hardship and found its endowment inadequate. In 1990, the Board of Trustees made the decision to close its doors.

== Accreditations and memberships ==
- The National Association of Schools of Music
- The Middle States Association of Colleges and Schools
- The National Association for Music Therapy
- The American Association of Music Therapy
- The Pennsylvania Department of Education (for teacher certification)

== Notable alumni ==
Notable Combs alumni include:

- Stanley Branche, civil rights activist, founder of the Committee for Freedom Now
- John Coltrane, saxophonist, composer
- Marc Copland, jazz pianist
- Khan Jamal, jazz vibraphonist
- Gail Levin, music therapist, author
- Robert Manno, composer, conductor, Windham Chamber Music Festival
- Vincent Persichetti, composer, author, educator
- John Cheek, bass-baritone - Metropolitan Opera

== Honorary degrees ==
Recipients of honorary Doctor of Music (D.Mus) degrees from Combs included:

- Marian Anderson, contralto
- Samuel Barber, composer, pianist, singer
- Harold Boatrite, composer, educator
- Romeo Cascarino, composer, pianist, arranger, educator
- Keith Chapman, composer, organist at the Wanamaker Organ
- Mischa Elman, concert violinist
- Marc Mostovoy, conductor, founder, Chamber Orchestra of Philadelphia
- Paul Nordoff, composer, music therapist, author
- Temple Painter, concert harpsichordist, organist, pianist, educator
- Vincent Persichetti, composer, author, educator
- Sidney Rothstein conductor
- Leopold Stokowski, conductor
- Mary Louise Curtis Bok Zimbalist, founder, Curtis Institute of Music
- Thomas LoMonaco, tenor, noted pedagogue
- Frank Versaci, concert flutist

Additionally, Combs awarded honorary Doctor of Humane Letters (D.H.L.) degrees to notables including:

- Pearl S. Buck, author, philanthropist
- Thacher Longstreth, civic leader, Philadelphia City Councilman
