= Journal of Voice =

- Discipline: Phonetics
- Language: English
- Edited by: Robert Thayer Sataloff

Publication details
- History: 1987–present
- Publisher: Elsevier
- Frequency: Bimonthly
- Impact factor: 2.009 (2020)

Standard abbreviations
- ISO 4: J. Voice

Indexing
- ISSN: 0892-1997

Links
- Journal homepage; Online access; Online archive

Journal of Voice is a bimonthly peer-reviewed medical journal published by Elsevier. It is an official journal of the Voice Foundation and the International Association of Phonosurgery. It deals with all subjects pertaining to voice sciences, voice medicine and surgery, and speech-language pathologists' management of voice-related problems. The editor-in-chief is Robert Thayer Sataloff. According to the Journal Citation Reports, the journal has a 2020 impact factor of 2.009.
