= National Football Foundation =

Non-profit organization in support of American football

- National Football Foundation & College Hall of Fame, Inc.
- Abbreviation: NFF
- Founded: 1947; 79 years ago
- Type: Nonprofit
- Headquarters: Irving, Texas
- Region served: United States; 120 chapters in 47 states
- Members: 12,000
- Chairman: Archie Manning
- President & CEO: Steven J. Hatchell
- Website: footballfoundation.org

The National Football Foundation (NFF) is a non-profit organization to promote amateur American football on all levels throughout the United States and develop "the qualities of leadership, sportsmanship, competitive zeal and the drive for academic excellence in America's young people". It was founded in 1947 with early leadership from General Douglas MacArthur, longtime Army Black Knights football coach Earl Blaik and journalist Grantland Rice.

In addition to supporting amateur football on the local level, the National Football Foundation also oversees the support, administration, and operation of the College Football Hall of Fame in Atlanta. The Foundation also hosts an Annual Awards Dinner in December at the Waldorf-Astoria in New York City, and tabulated and released the former Bowl Championship Series standings.

As of 2020, Archie Manning, a former Ole Miss Rebels football All-American and member of the College Football Hall of Fame, serves as chairman, and Steven J. Hatchell, the former commissioner of the Big 12 Conference and executive director of the FedEx Orange Bowl, serves as president and CEO. The foundation has 120 local chapters distributed among 47 states. Since 1956, more than 100,000 volunteers have become members.

== History ==
The NFF was incorporated as the National Football Shrine and Hall of Fame on December 8, 1947, in Syracuse, New York by Arthur Evans. Within a year, sportswriter Grantland Rice and Army football coach Earl Blaik had joined the board. The NFF was reorganized in 1954 with 11 schools serving as "founding subscribers": Brown, Dartmouth, Harvard, Manhattan, Michigan, Navy, Notre Dame, Penn, Princeton, Syracuse, and Yale.

Chet LaRoche became the organization’s first chairman in 1955 and invited General Douglas MacArthur to become chairman of the board in May 1958. The leadership of MacArthur, Blaik, and Rice offered credibility and national prominence to the organization.

== Awards ==
Among its other programs and initiatives includes the facilitation of the Play It Smart program, which places a trained "academic coach" who turns football teams into learning teams in underserved high schools across the country, and the awarding of the William V. Campbell Trophy, referred to in many circles as the "Academic Heisman". In spring 2007, the NFF launched the NFF Hampshire Honor Society, a recognition program for players who excel both on the field and in the classroom. Inductees must have been a starter in their final collegiate season and have earned a 3.2 cumulative GPA for their undergraduate degree.

The NFF issues a number of awards, including:

=== National Scholar-Athlete Awards ===
Founded in 1959, the award is presented each season to the nation's top scholar-athletes for excellence in academics, athletics and leadership. Each year, between 15 and 17 scholar-athletes are chosen from the NCAA Divisions I (both I-A/FBS and I-AA/FCS), II and III and the NAIA and awarded a $18,000 scholarship. One of the recipients is chosen and awarded the William V. Campbell Trophy (formerly the Draddy Trophy).

Notable former National Scholar-Athletes in the NFL include Ryan Tannehill (Texas A&M, 2011) and Joe Thomas (Wisconsin, 2006) and Super Bowl winners Peyton (Tennessee, 1997) and Eli Manning (Mississippi, 2003), Drew Brees (Purdue, 2000), Jonathan Vilma (Miami, 2003) and Dennis Dixon (Oregon, 2007). Non-sporting former recipients include Emmy and Golden Globe-nominated actor Mark Harmon (UCLA), NASA astronaut and USAF flight test engineer Michael S. Hopkins (Illinois), former USAF pilot and incumbent Hampden–Sydney College President Christopher B. Howard (U.S. Air Force Academy) and NBC anchor Stone Phillips (Yale).

=== National Football Foundation Gold Medal ===
The Gold Medal, the NFF’s highest honor, has been presented to seven U.S. Presidents, four U.S. Generals, three U.S. Admirals, one U.S. Supreme Court Justice, 25 Corporate CEOs and Chairmen. The most recent recipient of the award was Mark Harmon, in 2019.

=== Distinguished American Award ===
Presented on special occasions when a truly deserving individual emerges, the award honors someone who has applied the character building attributes learned from amateur sport in their business and personal life, exhibiting superior leadership qualities in education, amateur athletics, business and in the community. The award was most recently bestowed in 2016, to William H. McRaven.

=== MacArthur Bowl ===
Every year, the National Football Foundation awards the MacArthur Bowl to the NCAA Division I Football Bowl Subdivision (FBS) college football team determined to be the national champion. The award recipients since 2000 are:

- 2000: Oklahoma Sooners
- 2001: Miami Hurricanes
- 2002: Ohio State Buckeyes
- 2003: LSU Tigers
- 2004: vacated
- 2005: Texas Longhorns
- 2006: Florida Gators
- 2007: LSU Tigers
- 2008: Florida Gators
- 2009: Alabama Crimson Tide
- 2010: Auburn Tigers
- 2011: Alabama Crimson Tide
- 2012: Alabama Crimson Tide
- 2013: Florida State Seminoles
- 2014: Ohio State Buckeyes
- 2015: Alabama Crimson Tide
- 2016: Clemson Tigers
- 2017: Alabama Crimson Tide
- 2018: Clemson Tigers
- 2019: LSU Tigers
- 2020: Alabama Crimson Tide
- 2021: Georgia Bulldogs
- 2022: Georgia Bulldogs
- 2023: Michigan Wolverines
- 2024: Ohio State Buckeyes
- 2025: Indiana Hoosiers

=== John L. Toner Award ===
The annual award is given to an athletic director who has demonstrated superior administrative abilities and shown outstanding dedication to college athletics and particularly college football. The award's namesake and first recipient served as the head football coach at the University of Connecticut (UConn) from 1966 to 1970 and as the school's athletic director from 1969 to 1987.

Note: * = posthumously

- 1997: John Toner (Connecticut)
- 1998: Doug Dickey (Tennessee)
- 1999: Jake Crouthamel (Syracuse) and David M. Nelson* (Delaware)
- 2000: Frank Broyles (Arkansas)
- 2001: Milo R. "Mike" Lude (Washington)
- 2002: Bill Byrne (Oregon, Nebraska, Texas A&M)
- 2003: Andy Geiger (Syracuse, 5 universities) and John Clune*
- 2004: Vince Dooley (Georgia)
- 2005: Jack Lengyel (Missouri, Navy)
- 2006: DeLoss Dodds (Kansas State, Texas, Big Eight Conference)
- 2007: Jeremy Foley (Florida)
- 2008: Gene Smith (Ohio State, Iowa State)
- 2009: Jim Weaver (Virginia Tech)
- 2010: Robert Mulcahy (Rutgers)
- 2011: vacated
- 2012: Mal Moore (Alabama)
- 2013: Joe Castiglione (Oklahoma, Missouri)
- 2014: Kevin White (Duke)
- 2015: Mark Hollis (Michigan State)
- 2016: Chet Gladchuk (Navy)
- 2017: Dan Guerrero (UCLA)
- 2018: Thomas Beckett (Yale) and Bob Scalise (Harvard)
- 2019: Deborah Yow (NC State, Maryland, Saint Louis)
- 2020: Jack Swarbrick (Notre Dame)
- 2022: Mitch Barnhart (Kentucky)
- 2023: Tom Holmoe (BYU)
- 2024: Warde Manuel (Michigan)
- 2025: Rob Mullens (Oregon)

=== Chris Schenkel Award ===
Named in honor of broadcaster Chris Schenkel, the award is given annually to distinctive individuals in broadcasting with ties to a university.

- 1996: Chris Schenkel (ABC, CBS, P)urdue
- 1997: Jack Cristil (Mississippi State)
- 1998: Max Falkenstien (Kansas)
- 1999: Jack Fleming (West Virginia)
- 2000: Ray Christensen (Minnesota)
- 2001: Frank Fallon (Baylor)
- 2002: Bob Brooks (Iowa)
- 2003: Larry Munson (Vanderbilt, Georgia)
- 2004: Bob Robertson (Washington State)
- 2005: Tony Roberts (Columbia College, Notre Dame)
- 2006: Johnny Holliday (Maryland)
- 2007: Bill Hillgrove (Pittsburgh)
- 2008: Bob Curts (Idaho) & Dick Galiette (Yale)
- 2009: Larry Zimmer (Colorado)
- 2010: Joe Starkey (California)
- 2011: Woody Durham (North Carolina)
- 2012: Bob Barry Sr. (Oklahoma)
- 2013: Gene Deckerhoff (Florida State)
- 2014: Frank Beckmann (Michigan)
- 2015: Jim Hawthorne (LSU)
- 2016: Bob Rondeau (Washington)
- 2017: Jon Teicher (UTEP)
- 2018: Dave South (Texas A&M, Baylor, SWC)
- 2019: Eli Gold (Alabama)
- 2020: Dave Walsh (Wyoming)
- 2022: Don Fischer (Indiana)
- 2023: Charlie Neal (BET, ESPN, HBCU Go)
- 2024: John Morris (Baylor)
- 2025: Lee Corso (Florida State, ESPN)

== Poll ==
The FWAA-NFF Grantland Rice weekly poll of the top 16 college football teams was started in 2014; 10 members of the NFF vote in the poll in partnership with the Football Writers Association of America.
