= Journal of Singing =

- Editor in Chief: Matthew Hoch
- Categories: trade journal
- Frequency: 5 times per year
- Founded: 1944
- Company: National Association of Teachers of Singing (NATS)
- Country: USA
- Based in: Jacksonville, Florida
- Language: English

The Journal of Singing is the peer-reviewed journal sponsored and published by the National Association of Teachers of Singing (NATS). Published five times a year, the journal provides current information regarding the teaching of singing as well as results of recent research in the field. A refereed journal, it serves as a historical record and is a venue for teachers of singing and other scholars to share the results of their work in areas such as history, diction, voice science, medicine, and especially voice pedagogy. The journal was formerly known as the NATS Bulletin. Access to archived articles is only through NATS membership.
