= Inspirato Incorporated =

American travel company

Inspirato Incorpoated is an American subscription-based travel company headquartered in Denver, Colorado. Founded in 2011 by brothers Brent Handler and Brad Handler, the company allows members to access a portfolio of vacation homes, partner hotels, and resorts through a paid subscription. Inspirato traded publicly on the Nasdaq Stock Market from 2022 to 2026 before being acquired and taken private by Exclusive Investments LLC, the parent company of Exclusive Resorts, in February 2026.

== History ==
=== Founding and early growth (2011–2019) ===
Inspirato was founded in January 2011 in Denver, Colorado, by brothers Brent Handler and Brad Handler along with Martin Pucher and Brian Corbett. Brent and Brad Handler had previously co-founded the destination club Exclusive Resorts in 2002 before selling a majority stake in the company to AOL co-founder Steve Case in 2004. Brent Handler, credited as one of the pioneers of the destination-club sector, positioned Inspirato as a subscription-based alternative to earlier club models, giving members access to a portfolio of branded vacation homes and hotel partnerships.

=== Public listing (2021–2022) ===
In June 2021, Inspirato announced plans to become publicly traded through a merger with Thayer Ventures Acquisition Corporation, a special-purpose acquisition company (SPAC) that had previously invested in short-term rental company Sonder, in a deal valuing the combined company at an estimated $1.1 billion. At the time of the announcement, Inspirato's portfolio included more than 385 vacation homes and over 500 hotel and resort partners across more than 240 destinations. The transaction was approved by Thayer Ventures shareholders at a special meeting on February 8, 2022, and closed on February 11, 2022, with the combined company renamed Inspirato Incorporated. Its Class A common stock and warrants began trading on Nasdaq on February 14, 2022, under the ticker symbols "ISPO" and "ISPOW." Brent Handler continued as CEO of the newly public company, with Brad Handler serving as executive chairman.

=== Leadership changes and financial difficulties (2023–2024) ===
After going public, Inspirato's share price declined steadily amid rising operating losses and softening post-pandemic travel demand. On September 25, 2023, Brent Handler stepped down as CEO after nearly 13 years leading the company, remaining on its board as its largest shareholder; the board appointed director Eric Grosse, a former president of Expedia Worldwide and co-founder of the travel site Hotwire, as his successor. By the time of the transition, Inspirato had projected 2023 revenue of $320–340 million and a net loss of $30–45 million, and had reduced its leased property count by roughly 10 percent from earlier in the year.

In August 2024, Inspirato disclosed a $10 million capital infusion from One Planet Group, a private investment firm founded by entrepreneur Payam Zamani, in exchange for a controlling equity stake; Zamani became Inspirato's third CEO in roughly a year, also assuming the chairman role from Brad Handler. In December 2024, Zamani and One Planet Group increased their ownership stake through additional share purchases and the conversion of amounts owed to the firm into equity.

=== Acquisition by The Exclusive Collective (2025–2026) ===
On December 17, 2025, Exclusive Resorts' parent, Exclusive Investments LLC, announced the launch of a new multi-brand holding structure, The Exclusive Collective, alongside a definitive agreement to acquire Inspirato for $4.27 per share in an all-cash transaction valuing the company at approximately $59 million. Zamani stepped down as chairman and CEO upon closing, with James Henderson, CEO of The Exclusive Collective and Exclusive Resorts, serving as interim CEO of Inspirato.

Inspirato shareholders approved the merger at a special meeting on February 2, 2026, and the acquisition closed on February 3, 2026. Inspirato became a wholly owned, privately held subsidiary of The Exclusive Collective; its stock and warrants were delisted from Nasdaq, and the company moved to terminate its SEC reporting obligations. The Exclusive Collective — which also includes Exclusive Resorts and the short-term rental brand onefinestay, and is majority owned by Steve Case — reported that the combined organisation served approximately 24,000 members and travelers annually following the deal.

== See also ==
- Destination club
- Steve Case
