= Avantair =

Airline of the United States

IATA	ICAO	Call sign
—	VNR	AVANTAIR
- Founded: 2003
- Ceased operations: 2013
- Fleet size: 57
- Headquarters: Clearwater, FL
- Key people: Steven F. Santo
- Website: http://www.avantair.com

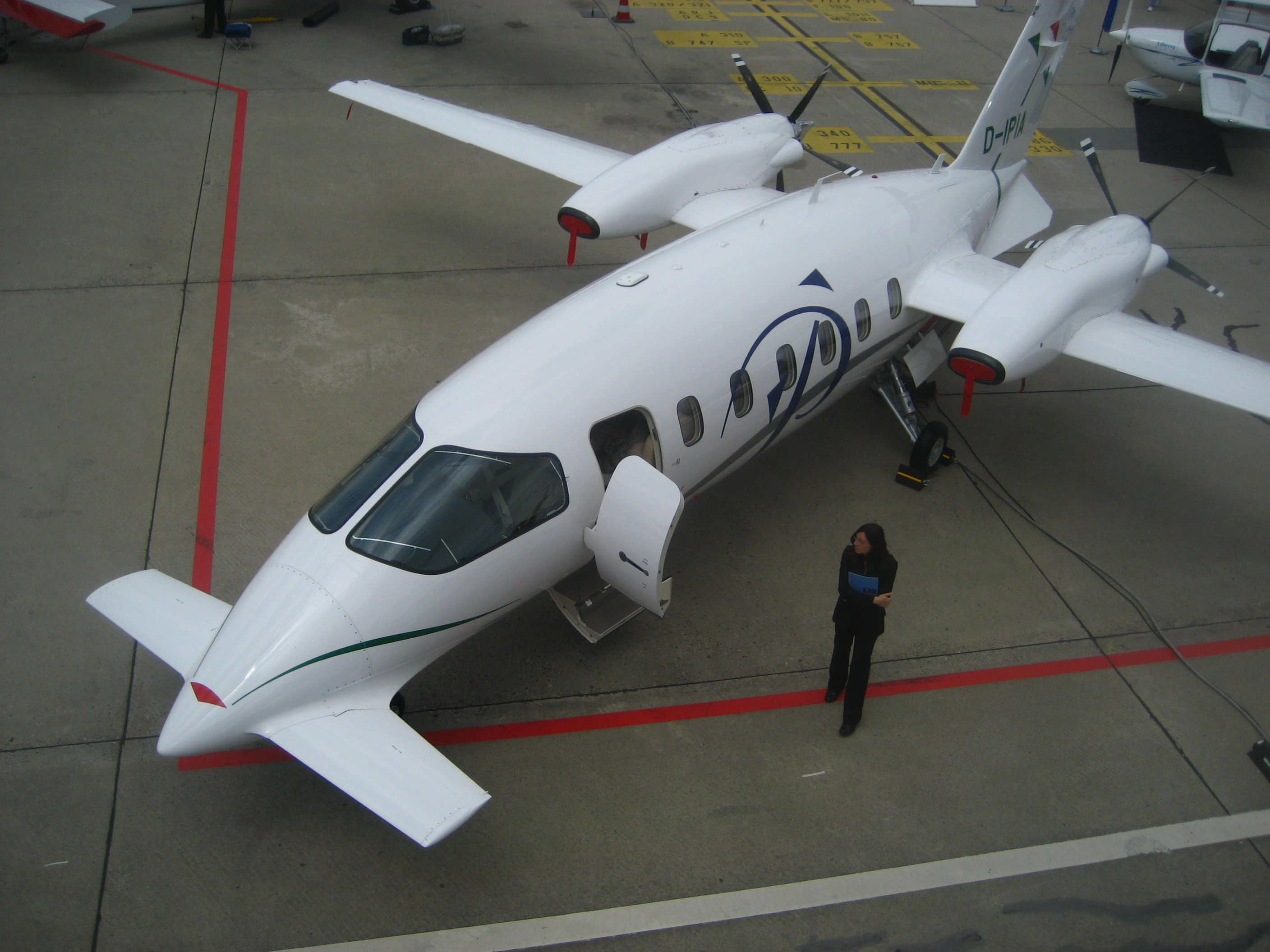
Avantair operated a fleet of Piaggio P180 Avanti aircraft.

Avantair was an aircraft fractional ownership company, headquartered at Clearwater, Florida, U.S.A.. Avantair provided fractional ownership, leasing and time card options within a fleet of twin-turboprop-engined P.180 aircraft. Avantair operated the largest fleet of Piaggio P180 aircraft in the world with a total fleet size of 56 aircraft as of June 2012. The company went out of business in 2013.

== History ==
Avantair was founded in July 2003 as the exclusive fractional provider of the Piaggio P.180 aircraft and in February 2007, became the only publicly traded (AAIR) stand-alone, private aircraft operator in the industry.

Avantair grounded its fleet in October 2012 following an incident in which an elevator separated from the tail of an aircraft in Camarillo, California. In June 2013, Avantair grounded their fleet again due to questions about maintenance and replacement of time-sensitive parts. By the end of June 2013 the company announced that it could not pay workers for shifts worked after June 8, 2013. The company furloughed air and ground crew and was seeking additional financing to resume operations. The company was also the subject of several class action lawsuits and an individual suit alleging that it had failed to provide pre-paid service to customers.

Avantair declared bankruptcy and then held an initial bankruptcy auction on January 10, 2014.

== Fleet ==
- 56 x Piaggio P180 Avanti
- 1 x IAI-1125 Astra
