= Piaggio P.180 Avanti =

Executive transport aircraft

P.180 Avanti
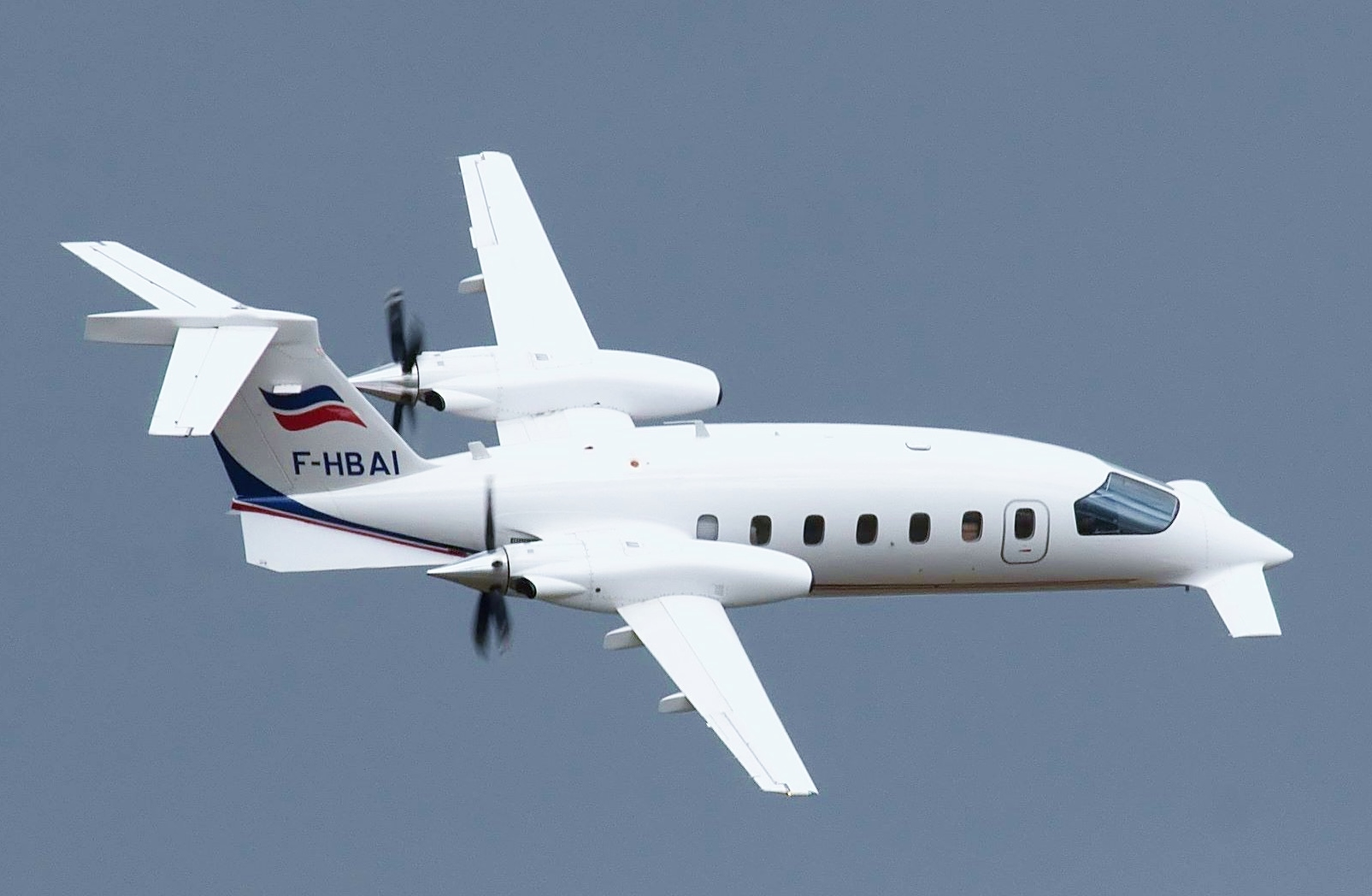

General information
- Type: Executive transport
- National origin: Italy
- Manufacturer: Piaggio Aero
- Status: In production
- Primary users: Italian Air Force Italian Army; Italian Navy; Avantair (historical)
- Number built: 246 (Dec 2020)

History
- Manufactured: 1986–present
- Introduction date: 30 September 1990
- First flight: 23 September 1986

The Piaggio P.180 Avanti is an executive/VIP light transport aircraft, designed by Piaggio Aero and built in Italy. It features twin, wing-mounted turboprop engines, in a pusher configuration. The Avanti seats up to nine people in a pressurized cabin and may be flown by one or two pilots. The design is of three-surface configuration, having both a small forward canard wing and a conventional tailplane, as well as its main wing, with the main wing spars passing behind the passenger cabin area. The FAI lists it as the fastest propeller-driven aircraft with speed of 927.4 km/h (576.3 mph; 500.8 kn).

== Development ==
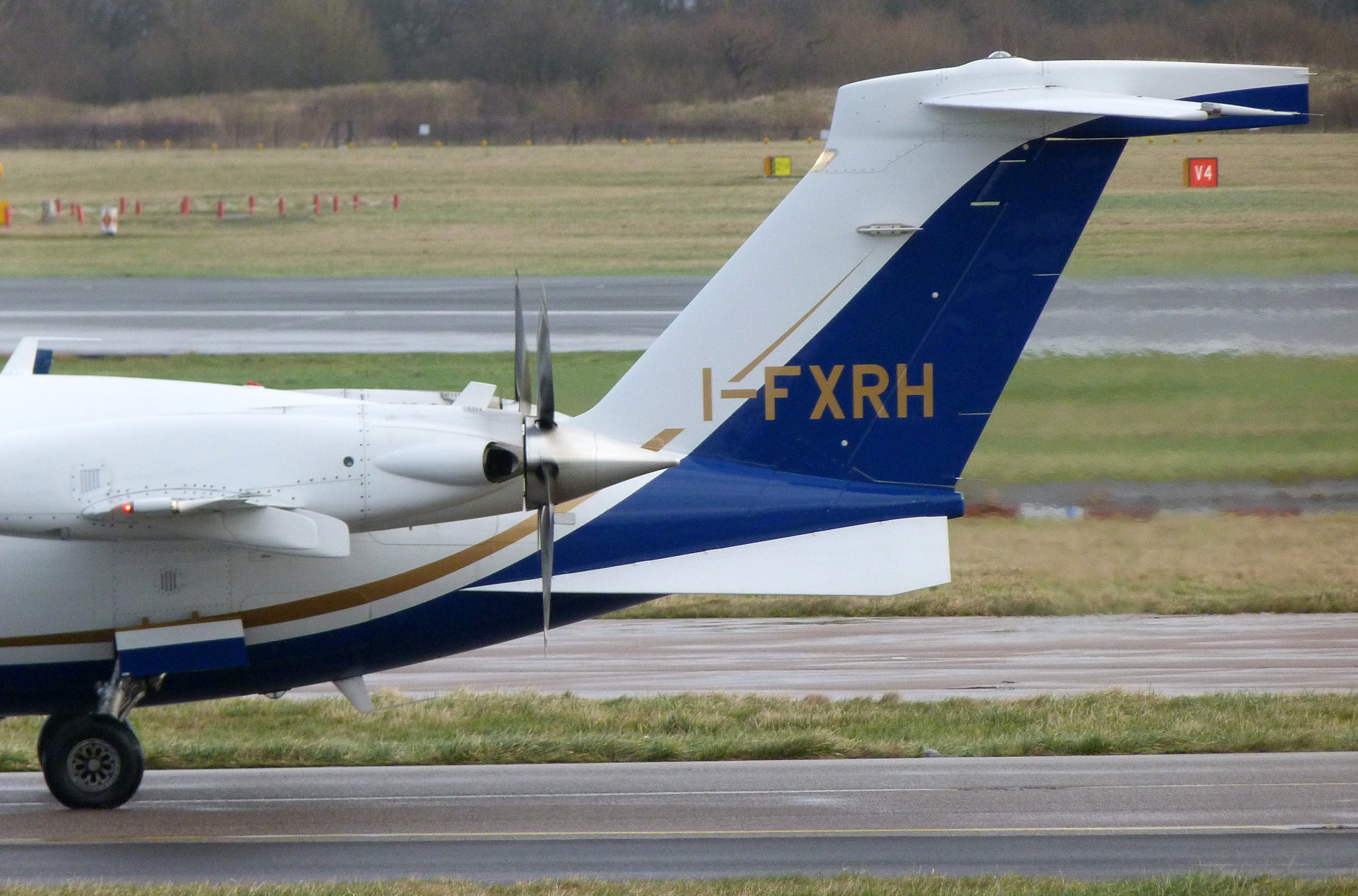
Piaggio P.180 Avanti II empennage and delta fins (only one visible)

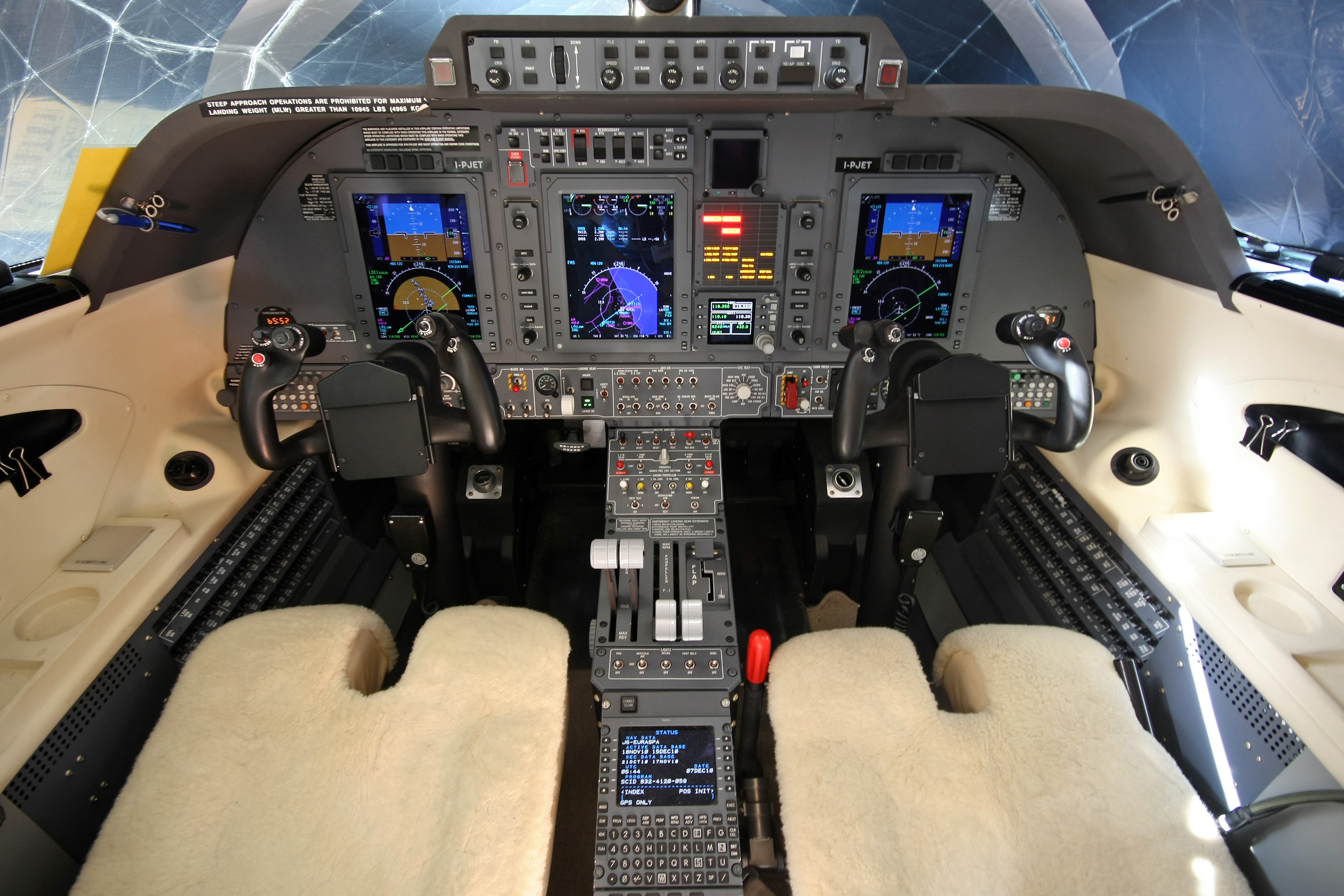
Avanti II flight deck

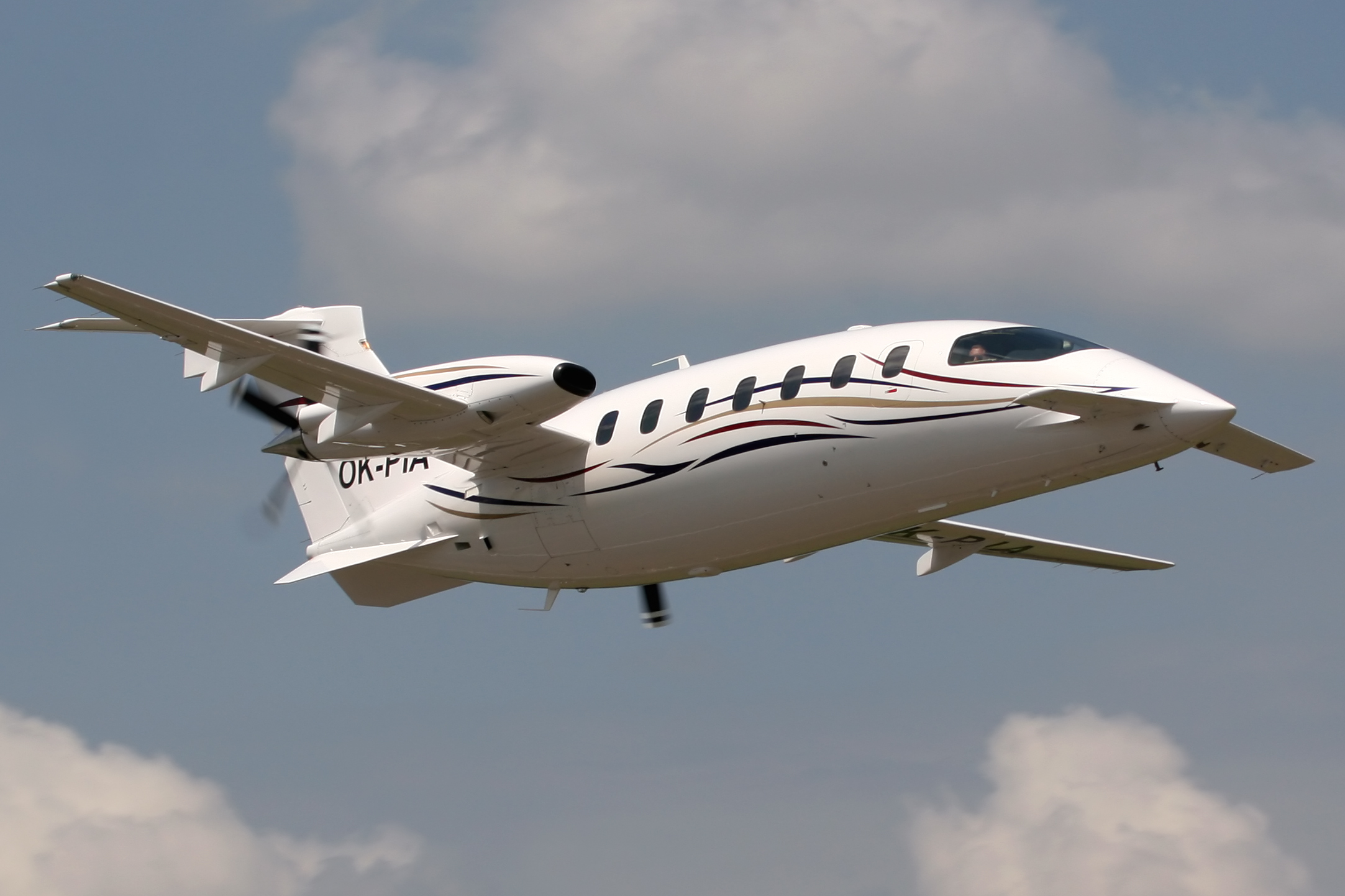
Clean configuration

A 1980s wave of new-generation planes, developed to appeal to Fortune 500 clients, included Piaggio's Avanti and Beech Aircraft Corp.'s very similar Starship. Engineering studies for the airplane that would eventually be named Avanti began in 1979 and designs were tested in wind tunnels in Italy and the United States in 1980 and 1981, conducted by Professor Jan Roskam from the University of Kansas (using Wichita State University's wind tunnel and Boeing's transonic wind tunnel in Seattle) along with Professor Gerald "Jerry" Gregorek (1931-2019) at Ohio State University (using OSU's 2D pressure wind tunnel).

Piaggio's chief engineer, Alessandro Mazzoni, filed in 1982 to patent the Avanti design. Beginning in 1983, Gates Learjet partnered with Piaggio to develop a fuselage for the new aircraft (referred to as Gates Piaggio GP-180). Learjet's design influence can be seen in the steeply raked windshield and the two large ventral delta fins under the tail. At high angles of attack these delta fins provide a nose-down pitching moment and help to avoid a potential stall, and they increase stability in flight by damping yaw and Dutch roll.

Gates Learjet's financial problems ended their collaboration in January 1986, but Piaggio continued the project, and the first prototype flew on 23 September 1986. The P.180 Avanti received Italian certification on 7 March 1990 and American certification was obtained on 2 October 1990.

The first 12 fuselages were manufactured in Wichita, Kansas, with H & H Parts and Plessey Midwest, then flown to Italy for final assembly. Avanti Aviation Wichita ran out of money in 1994; the project languished until a group of investors led by Piero Ferrari became involved in 1998. The 100th aircraft was delivered in October 2005 and the 150th in May 2008. Piaggio reported that, as of October 2010, the Avanti and Avanti II fleets had logged over 500,000 flying hours.

An improved Avanti II obtained European and U.S. certification in November 2005. Six months later, 70 planes had been ordered, including 36 by Avantair. Avanti II received type approval for Russia in 2011. The Avanti II featured uprated Pratt & Whitney Canada PT6A-66B turboprop engines and flies about 18 km/h (11 mph) faster, with better fuel economy; and an all-new "glass panel" avionics suite from Rockwell Collins reduced cockpit clutter. In addition to heading, attitude and navigation information, flat panel color liquid crystal displays add collision avoidance (TCAS), ground proximity (TAWS) and real-time graphic weather depiction.

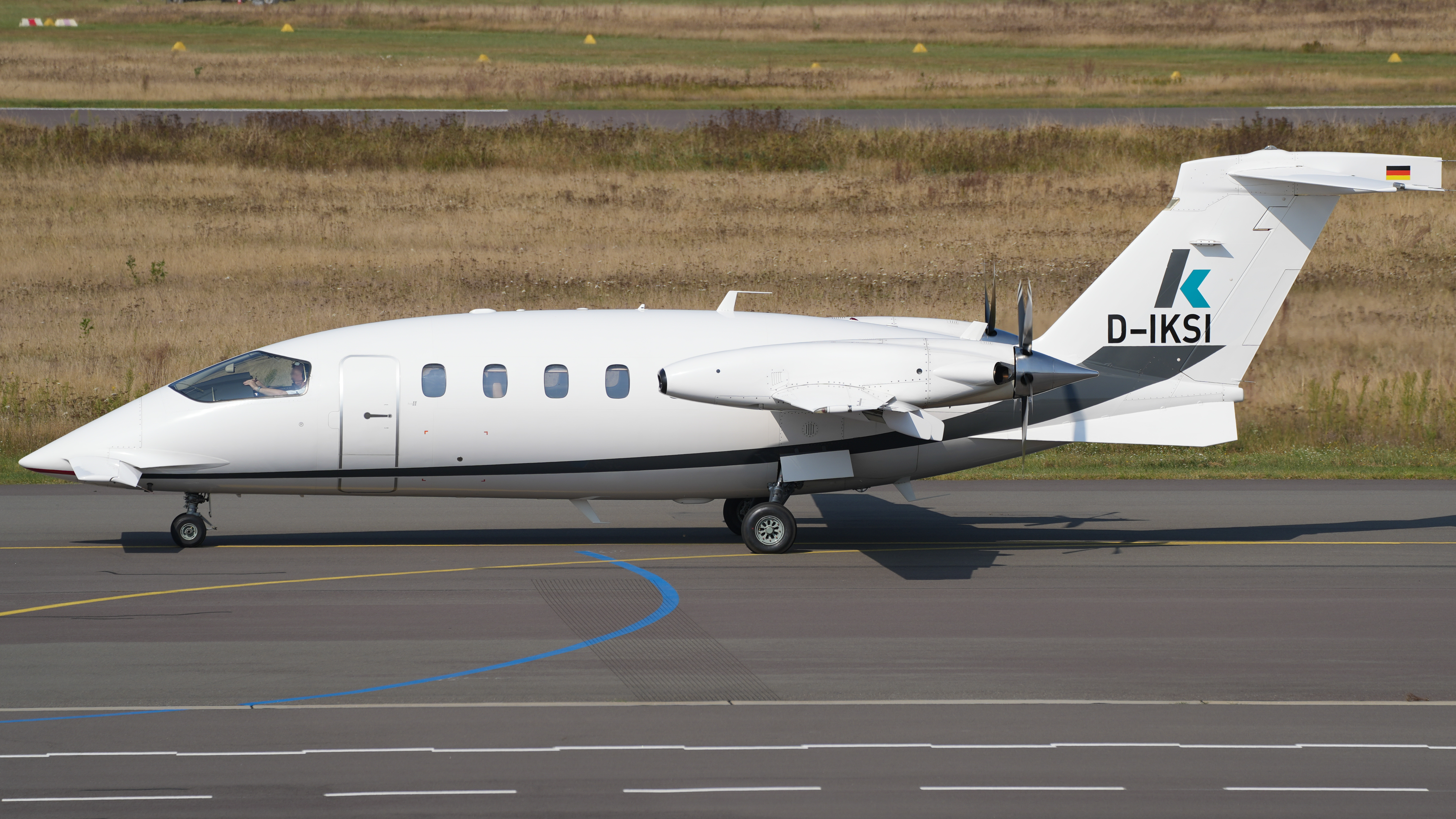
A Piaggio P.180 at Braunschweig Airport

The Avanti is marketed as being faster than other turboprops and many midsized jets, with cost efficiency as much as 40 percent better than market-competing jets, as a result of less drag and a lower fuel burn rate. Powered by the same Pratt & Whitney Canada PT6A-66 engines as the Beech Super King Air 200, the Avanti II is 100 knots (190 km/h) faster than that model. Flying magazine judged the Avanti to be the "Fastest Civilian Turboprop Twin" in 2014, saying "Avanti's speed is pretty much on par with Cessna's M2, while providing more space and a lower operating cost."

First flown in 2013, the P.1HH UAV prototype crashed off Sicily in May 2016 after 100 hours of flight tests; a second prototype flew in July 2017 before two others joined. The first Avanti EVO manufactured at the new $150 million factory at Albenga Airport was delivered in 2016, one year after moving production from its previous Genoa Cristoforo Colombo Airport plant.

On 22 November 2018, Piaggio Aerospace entered receivership after declaring itself insolvent as its restructuring plan failed. After the 2008 financial crisis, a key US fractional customer went bankrupt and P.180 Evo sales dropped from a 2008 peak of 30 deliveries to just three in 2018. By November 2018, no P.1HHs were delivered to the UAE and the Italian Ministry of Defence €766 million support for the P.2HH program was frozen as populist coalition partner Five Star Movement prioritized social programmes over defence spending.

On 21 June 2019, the Italian government committed to €716 million in orders to make the business more attractive to a potential buyer: €260 million from the defence ministry for nine new Avanti Evos, plus an upgrade of 19 earlier aircraft; €200 million for engine maintenance; €160 million for the P1HH HammerHead certification completion and at least one system (two aircraft and one ground station) acquisition; and €96 million for logistics support. While the deals should have been approved later, two aircraft had been delivered so far in 2019, and two more remained in the backlog.

Three non-binding expressions of interest to buy the aircraft business had been received, 10 for the engine business and 26 for the whole company. The official tender for the sale of Piaggio Aerospace was to start after the summer of 2019.

By December 2020, the fleet surpassed one million flight hours. 246 aircraft have been produced, of which 213 are in service: 96 in Europe, 95 in the Americas, 18 in Asia-Pacific, and four in Africa and the Middle East.

== Design ==
The Avanti's counter-rotating turboprop engines are placed on a mid-set, high-aspect-ratio wing located just behind the cabin. The three-surface design incorporates both a T-tail and a pair of small, fixed forewings having slight anhedral and landing flaps. On the Avanti II these flaps automatically deploy in concert with the main wing flaps. This reduces the load on the tailplane, even when the flaps are deployed, by reducing the pitch-down moment created by the deployment of the main wing flaps. This in turn allows the size of both the tailplane and the main wing to be reduced. This particular three-lifting-surface configuration was patented in 1982.

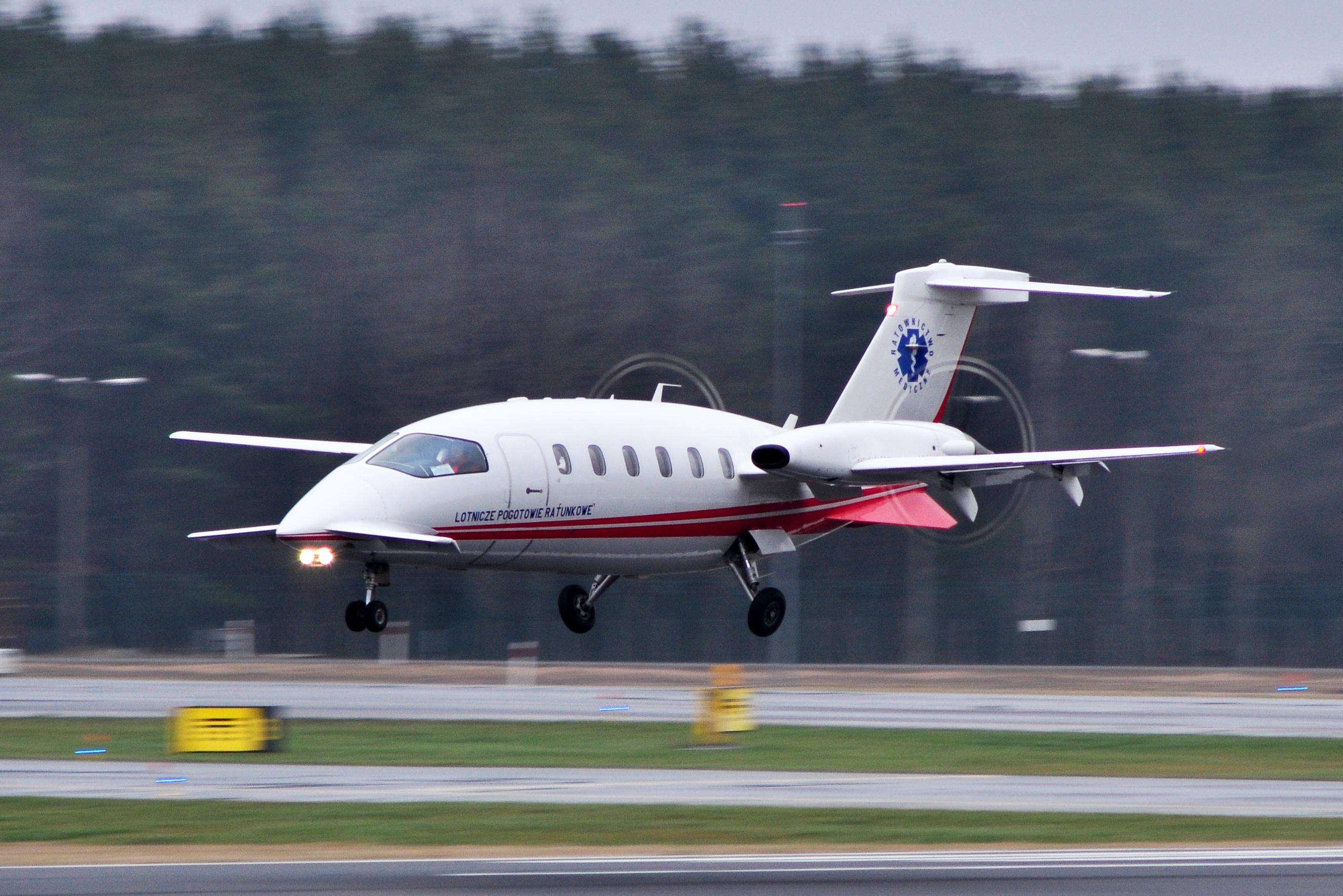
The Avanti's forward wing flaps deploy automatically with the main wing flaps to maintain neutral pitch trim.

The forward wing's angle of incidence is slightly greater than that of the main wing, so that it stalls before the main wing, producing an automatic nose-down effect prior to the onset of main-wing stall; its five-degree anhedral (negative dihedral) keeps the stream wash interference clear of the engine inlets, the main wing and the tailplane.

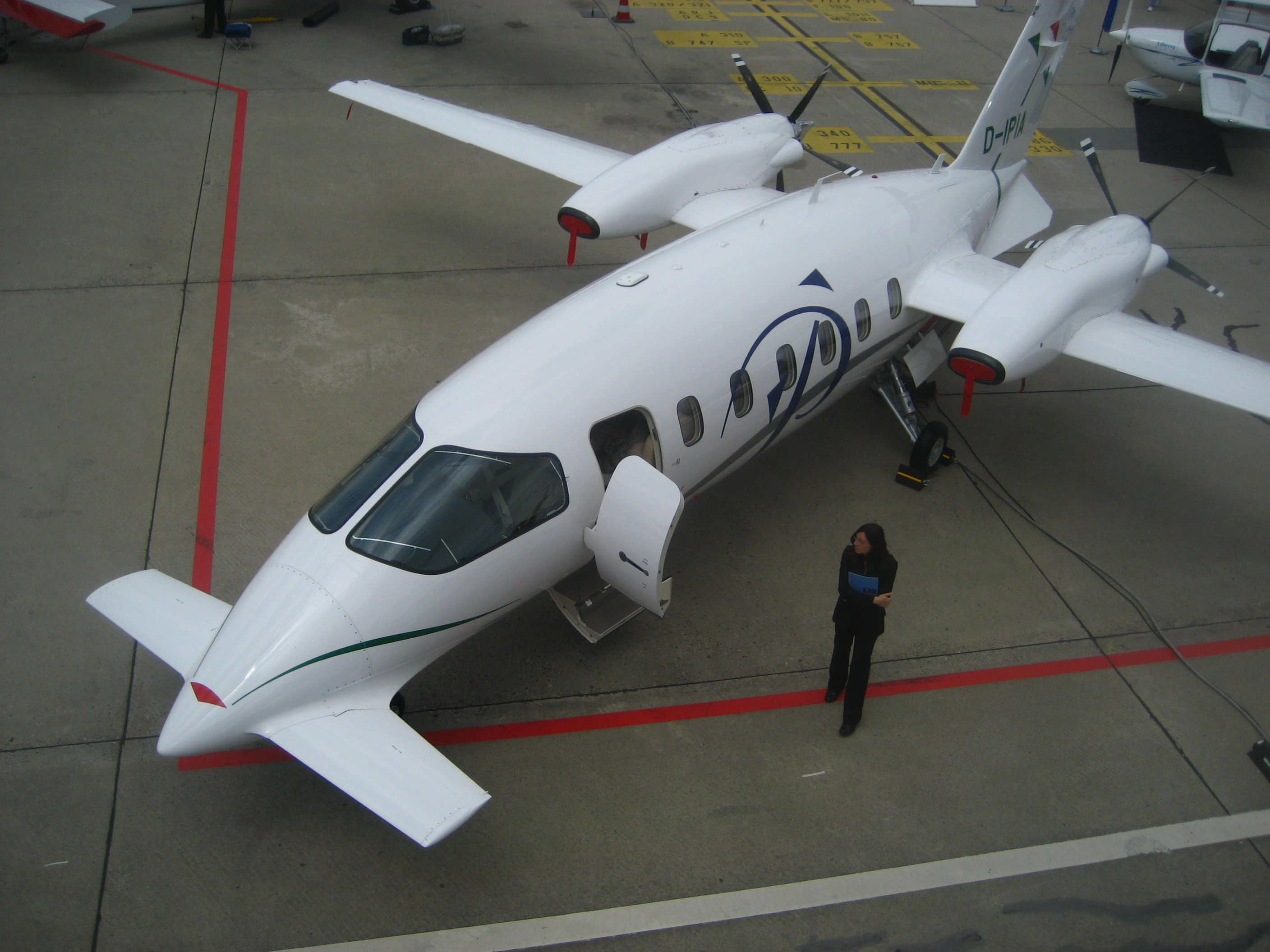
Showing the continuously varying curve of the fuselage cross-section and forward wing

The cabin cross-section varies continuously along the length of the aircraft; the shape approximates an NACA airfoil section, and the slowly changing curve helps prolong laminar flow on the front of the fuselage. Piaggio claims that the fuselage contributes up to 20% of the Avanti's total lift, with the front and rear wing providing the remaining 80%. Due to the unusual fuselage shape, the mid-cabin is considerably wider than the cockpit. The front and rear airfoils are custom sections designed by Jerry Gregorek of Ohio State University's Aeronautical and Astronautical Research Laboratory to achieve a drag-reducing 50% laminar flow at cruise. The company claims the overall design of the P.180 Avanti II enables the wing to be 34% smaller than on conventional aircraft.

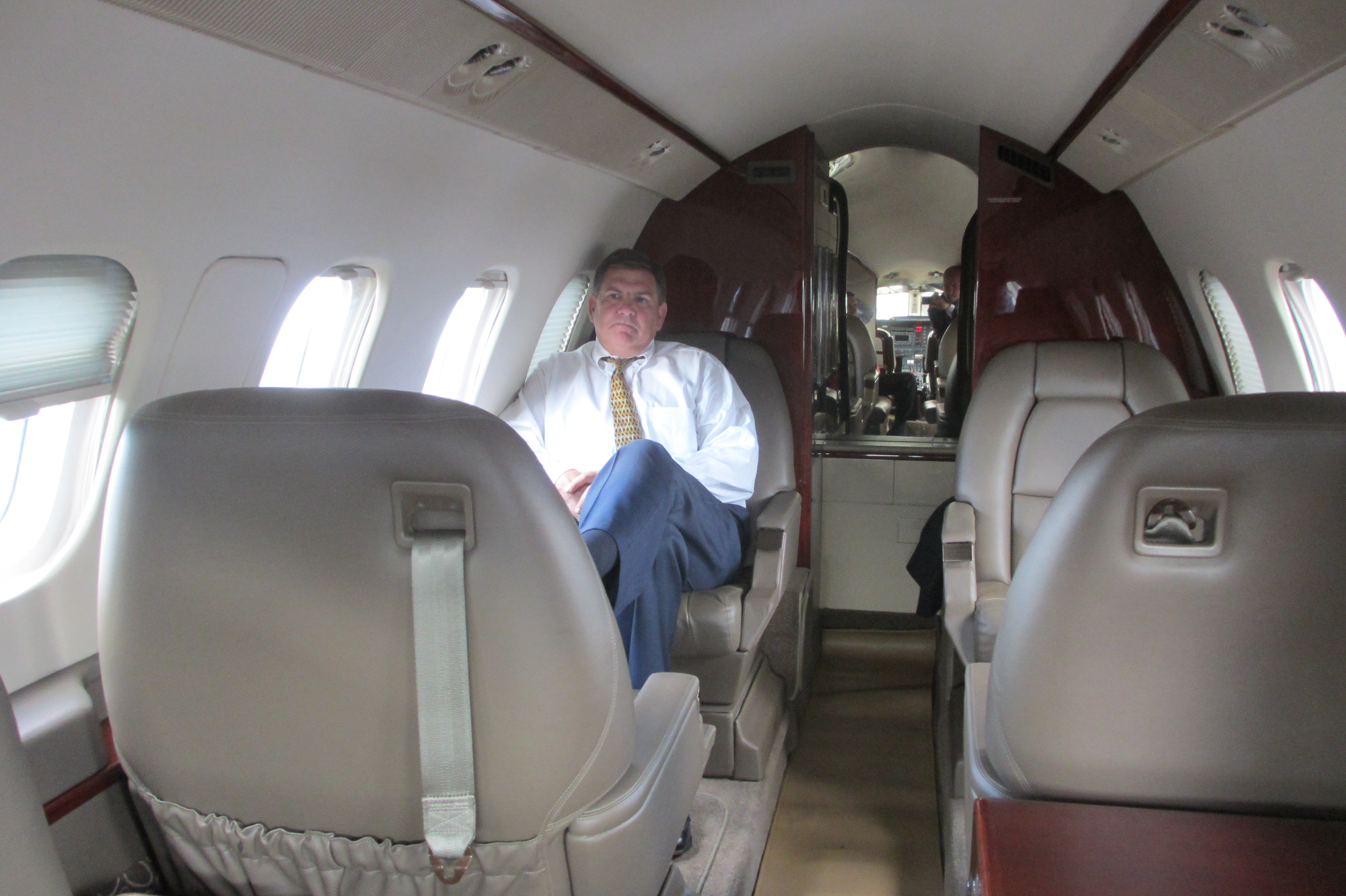
Cabin

The P.180 is reported to have good fuel efficiency relative to small turbojets flying in the same speed and altitude range. Flight International stated:

"The Avanti has no direct turboprop competitors, its closest jet rivals are the Raytheon Premier I and the Cessna Citation CJ2+ ... Piaggio says low-drag laminar flow is maintained to around 50% of the wing chord, compared with around 20–25% for conventional tractor turboprops where propeller wash disturbs the airflow over the wing... specific air range at high altitude is 3.4 km/kg (0.83 nmi/lb) compared with around 2 km/kg (0.49 nmi/lb) for current jets or 2.7 km/kg (0.66 nmi/lb) for other turboprops."

By this estimate, fuel efficiency is 70% better than comparable jet aircraft, although this greater efficiency is achieved only at a relatively slow 315 KTAS and FL410. P.180 Avanti II Specifications now show slightly lower numbers for specific range of 3.1 km/kg (0.76 nmi/lb).

Interior noise is lower than in conventional turboprop aircraft, because the propellers and engine exhausts are behind the cabin. Piaggio quotes 68 dBA. However, due to the strongly disturbed flow in which the pusher propellers operate, the exterior noise is higher. The exterior noise level and its higher pitched sound has been shown to be the result primarily of the interaction of the turbine engine exhaust flows and the five-bladed pusher propellers (est. +9 dB). On takeoff, the Avanti has been measured at 81.9 dBA sideline noise level, slightly lower than the Beechcraft King Air at 82.8 dBA. This is below FAA stage-3 noise limits, which set a maximum of 89 EPNdB for takeoff. However, the P.180 has been the subject of noise complaints at airports, such as Aspen–Pitkin County Airport in Colorado, as well as Naples Municipal Airport, Florida, where that airport authority determined that it was the noisiest aircraft using the facility. Alan Parker, chairman of the Naples Municipal Airport Authority's technical committee, described the Avanti as "irritating loud" and compared the high-pitched sound to "fingernails on a chalkboard".

The Piaggio P.180 Avanti has a sea-level standard-day maximum-gross-weight takeoff distance of 869 m (2,851 ft) and a landing roll of 872 m (2,861 ft).

Deliveries were at a high of 30 in 2008, but only two in 2013.

In 2014 Piaggio announced development of an updated version, named EVO. It uses new Hartzell composite propellers, with blades of scimitar configuration. Its wings carry new winglets; aerodynamic improvements have been incorporated, and an additional 60-gallon (400 lb) fuel tank option to increase range to 1,770 nautical miles (3,280 kilometres; 2,040 miles). The company predicts improved climb performance, 250 nmi greater range, and 3% reduction in fuel usage. The revised propeller shape, combined with a lower engine speed, promises a 68% reduction in external noise. Avanti EVO type certification was granted by EASA on 28 November 2014, and by the FAA on 6 July 2015. Projected purchase price was $7.4 million in 2014. By 2021 the equipped price was $7.695 million. The first EVO was delivered in April 2015, with five more to follow the same year.

== Variants ==
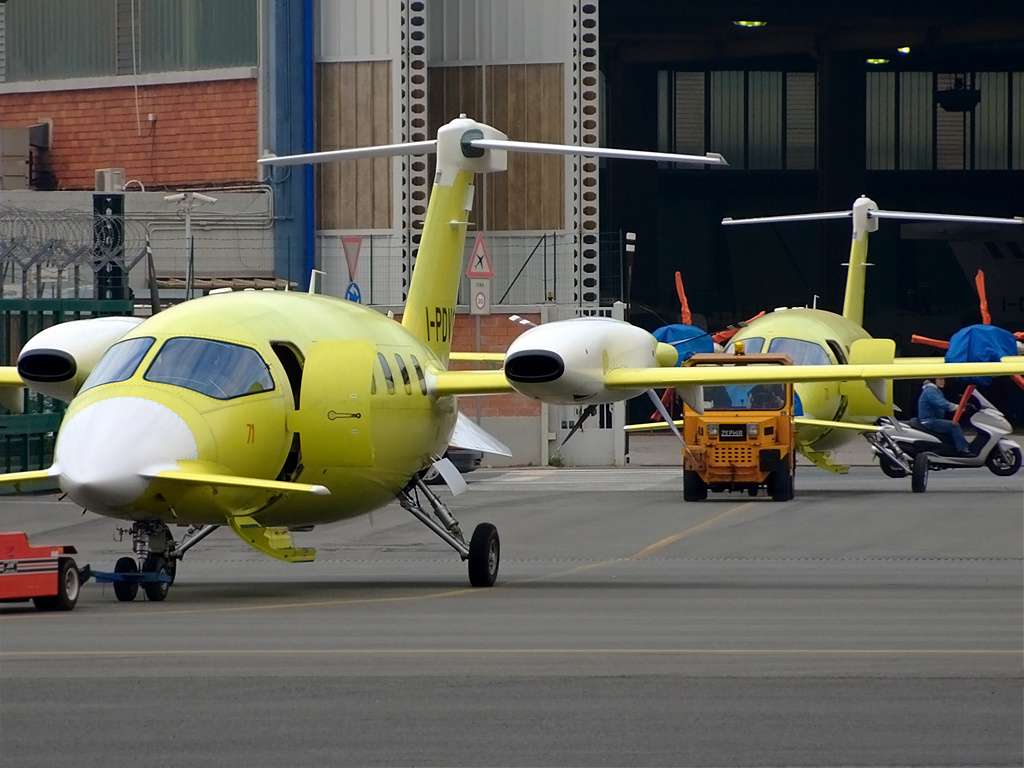
Two Avantis leaving assembly for testing

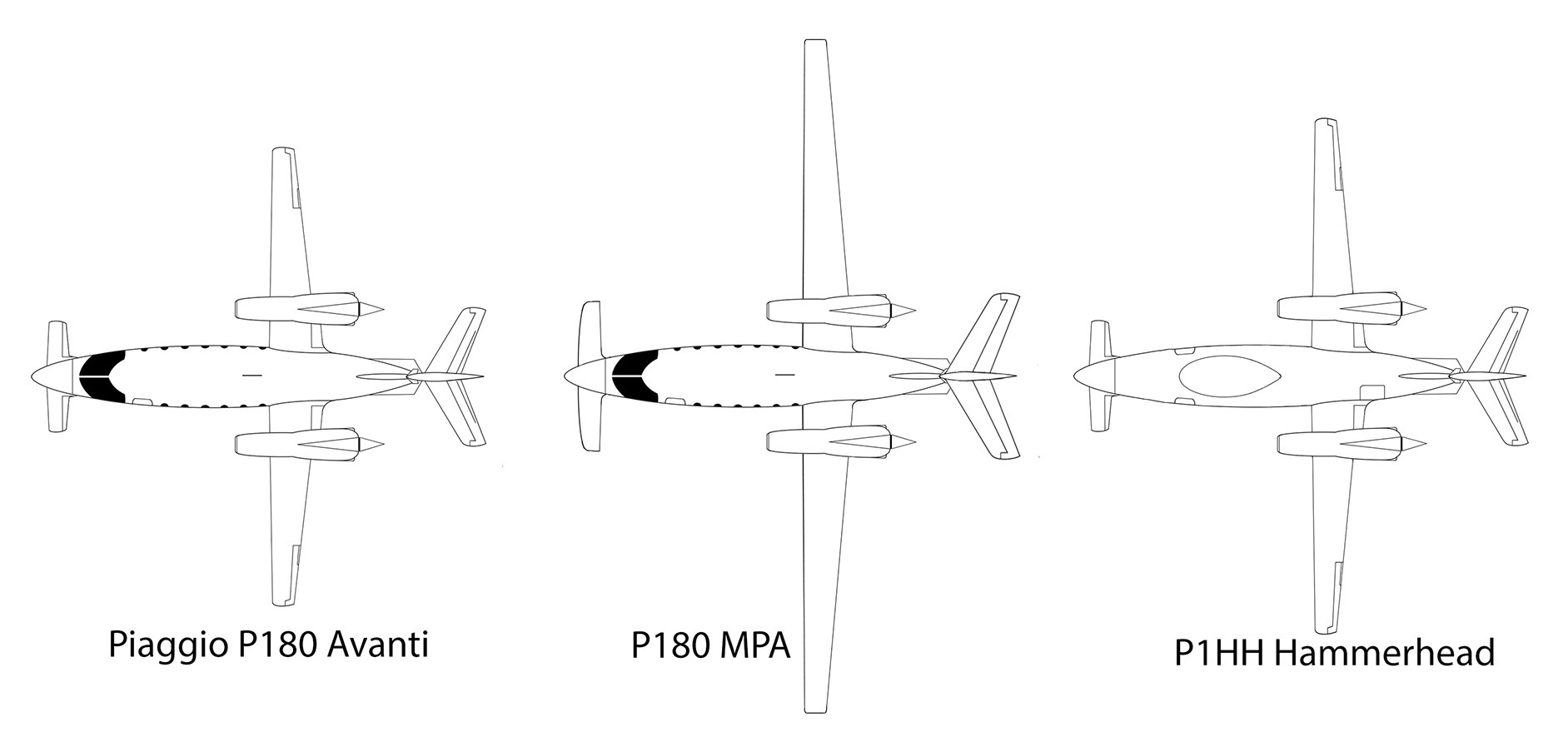
Comparison between Avanti, P180 MPA and P1HH

P.180 Avanti
First production variant.

P180 M
Military version with a combination passenger/freighter configuration for use as a VIP and light utility transport.

P.180 RM
Variant for use in radio calibration.

P.180 AMB
Air ambulance variant.

P.180 APH
Aerial cartography.

P.180 Avanti II
Variant with improved avionics and engines.

P-180 EVO+
Variant with 400kt TAS and higher useful load.

Multirole Patrol Aircraft (MPA)
Initially called Maritime Patrol Aircraft, MPA is a variant of the Avanti II with a larger wingspan and bigger fuel tanks. As with the EVO propulsion system, MPA uses more powerful Pratt & Whitney Canada PT6A-66B engines and Hartzell five-blade scimitar propellers. MPA electronics include the Albatros mission system from Saab Group and Pro Line Fusion avionics from Rockwell Collins.

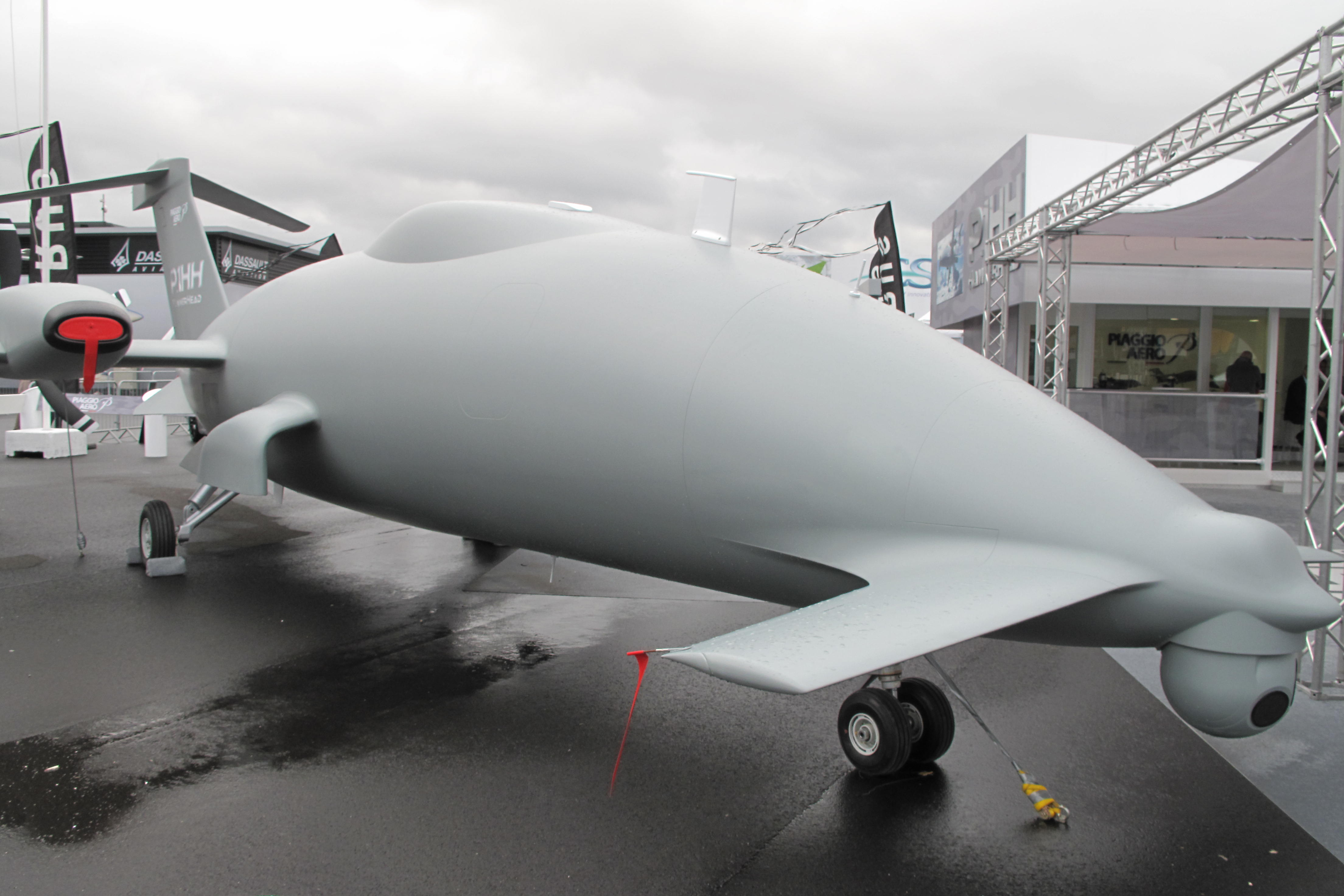
P.1HH HammerHead at Paris Air Show 2013

Piaggio-Selex P.1HH Hammerhead
Medium-altitude long-endurance unmanned aerial vehicle based on the Avanti II airframe, with an increased wingspan and the ability to carry up to 1,100 pounds (500 kg) of weapons. The P.1HH HammerHead Mission Management System is based on the Selex ES (now Leonardo S.p.A.) skyISTAR solution. The vehicle's first flight took place in December 2013 from Trapani–Birgi Italian Air Force base.
The Italian Air Force signed an agreement with Piaggio Aerospace to buy three Unmanned Aerial System P.1HH HammerHead (six aircraft and three ground control stations) with delivery starting from the early months of 2016. United Arab Emirates Air Force ordered eight P.1HH aircraft. On 31 May 2016 the first P.1HH prototype crashed off the Sicilian coast, delaying flight testing for thirteen months during construction of a second prototype. Piaggio flew the second prototype at Trapani–Birgi military airport on 5 July 2017 The UAE was to take delivery of six P.1HHs in 2018 and the remaining two in 2019, however by November 2018, no P.1HHs had been delivered and Piaggio Aerospace requested to be placed into receivership.

P.2HH
Piaggio develops with Leonardo, the Italian and UAE Armed Forces a P.1HH successor for 2023, with a new wing, more composite materials, and re-thought systems. With a larger wing and airframe, maximum endurance rose to 30 h, but following the 2018 Italian election, the country's €766 million program for 20 aircraft and 10 control stations was suspended.

B.TL.20
(Thai: บ.ตล.๒๐) Royal Thai Armed Forces designation for the Avanti EVO.

== Operators ==
=== Civil ===
The Avanti is operated by charter companies and small feeder airlines, and is also used as a business aircraft. The fractional aircraft operator Avantair was Piaggio's largest client, with a fleet of 57 Avanti aircraft, before they went bankrupt and the fleet was liquidated.

In May 2017, 220 aircraft were in operation around the world, with 89 being first-generation Avanti, 126 second-generation Avanti II and 6 Avanti EVO models.

A Piaggio Avanti San Diego-to-Charleston flight in 2003, piloted by Joe Ritchie with co-pilot Steve Fossett, set National Aeronautic Association and Fédération Aéronautique Internationale transcontinental speed records with an average speed of 475.2 knots (880.1 km/h; 546.9 mph), breaking the previous Los Angeles to New York turboprop record of 395.21 knots set by Chuck Yeager in 1986 in a Piper Cheyenne 400LS. Elapsed time for the Avanti's coast-to-coast trip was 3:51:52.

=== Current operators ===
Indonesia

- Susi Air

=== Government ===
Bulgaria

- Bulgarian Air Force
  - 28th Air Detachment

Canada

- Royal Canadian Mounted Police (former operator – aircraft sold in 2014)

Italy

- Italian Air Force operates 17 Piaggio P.180 Avanti since 1994 and 9 P-180 EVO+ since November 2024
- Italian Army
- Italian Navy
- Carabinieri
- Guardia di Finanza
- Corps of the Port Captaincies – Coast Guard
- Polizia di Stato
- Corpo Forestale dello Stato
- Corpo Nazionale dei Vigili del Fuoco
- Ente Nazionale per l'Assistenza al Volo

Poland

- Polish Medical Air Rescue (LPR) – 2 (1 Avanti, 1 Avanti II)

Russia

- Federal State Unitary Enterprise "State ATM Corporation" – 1 (1 Avanti II)

United Arab Emirates

- United Arab Emirates Air Force – 2

== Accidents and incidents ==
On 21 October 2022, Gold's Gym owner Rainer Schaller, his partner, his two children, and two others were killed in the crash of a German-registered Avanti into the ocean near Limón, Costa Rica. The flight had departed Palenque, Mexico.

== Specifications (P180 Avanti EVO) ==
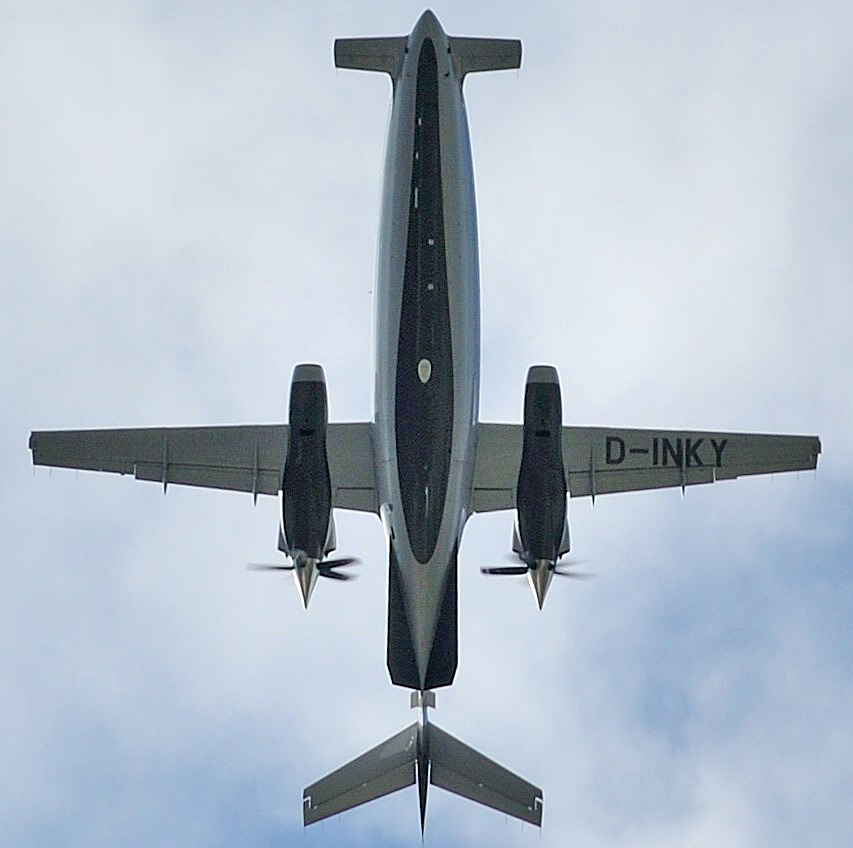
Planform view of the Avanti, highlighting its unusual design

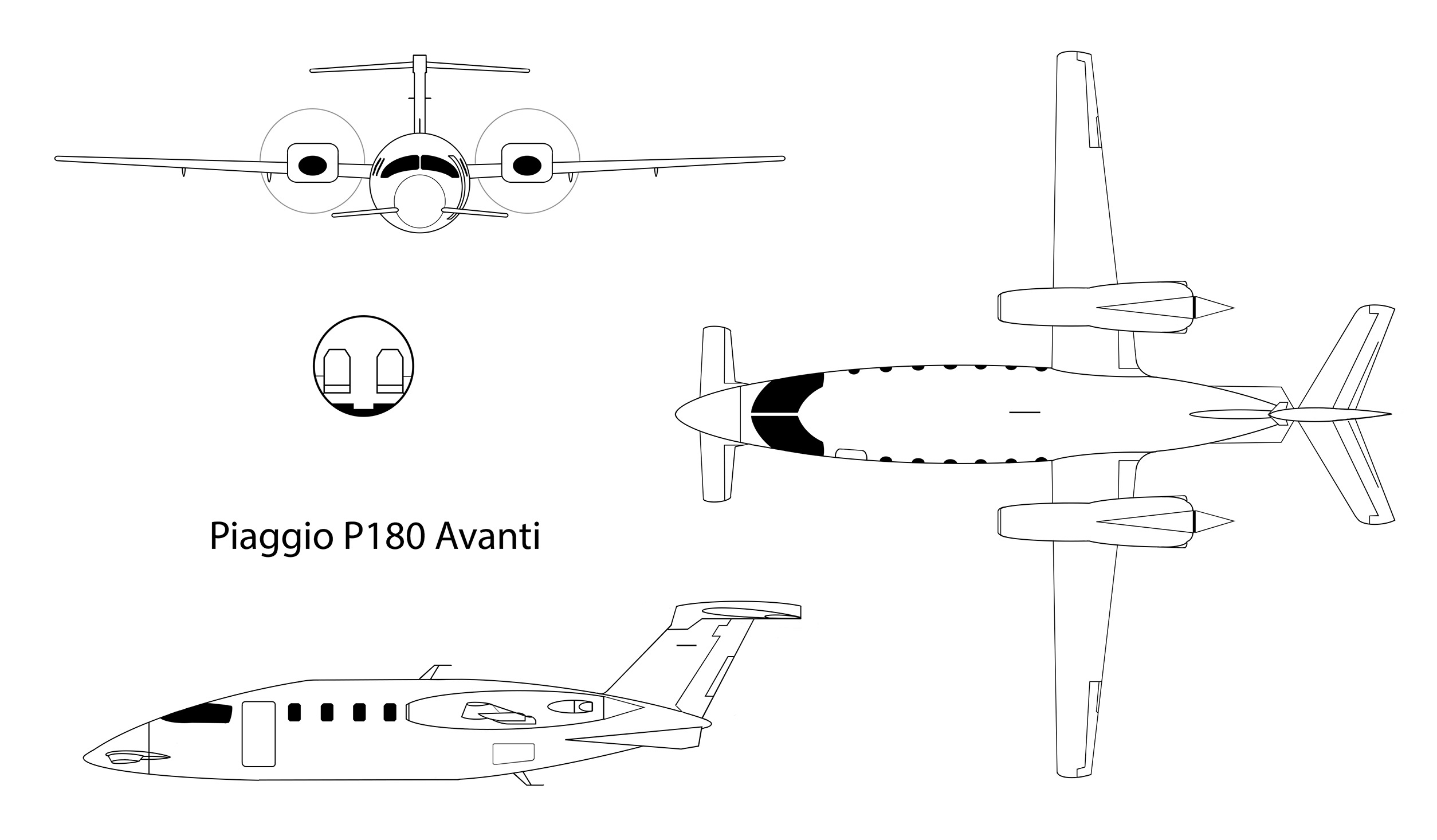
Three-view diagram and cross-section

Data from Aviation Week

General characteristics

- Crew: 1
- Capacity: 7–9
- Length: 14.4 m (47.3 ft)
- Wingspan: 14 m (46 ft)
- Height: 4.0 m (13 ft)
- Wing area: 15.99 m^{2} (172.1 sq ft)
- Aspect ratio: 12.3
- Airfoil: PE 1300G (root), PE 1491G/1332G (tip)
- Empty weight: 3,799 kg (8,375 lb)
- Max takeoff weight: 5,488 kg (12,100 lb)
- Fuel capacity: 1,271 kg (2,802 lb)
- Max landing weight: 5,216 kg (11,500 lb)
- Max zero-fuel weight: 4,445 kg (9,800 lb)
- Cabin: 17.5 feet (5.3 m) long, 5.8 feet (1.8 m) high, 6.1 feet (1.9 m) wide (3.5 ft floor)
- Foreplane area: 2.19 m² (23.59 ft²)
- Horizontal stabilizer area: 3.83 m² (41.27 ft²)
- Powerplant: 2 × Pratt & Whitney Canada PT6A-66B turboprop, 630 kW (850 shp) each ISA+28C Flat Rated

Performance

- Maximum speed: 740 km/h (460 mph, 400 kn) FL310 high speed cruise
- Cruise speed: 589 km/h (366 mph, 318 kn) FL410 long range cruise
- Minimum control speed: 190 km/h (120 mph, 100 kn)
- Range: 2,800 km (1,740 mi, 1,510 nmi) 4 passengers, NBAA IFR, 100-nm alternate
- Ferry range: 2,830 km (1,760 mi, 1,530 nmi)
- Service ceiling: 12,000 m (41,000 ft)
- Time to altitude: 10 min to FL 250
- Wing loading: 343 kg/m^{2} (70.3 lb/sq ft)
- Fuel consumption: 0.220 kg/km (0.779 lb/mi)
- Power/mass: 230 W/kg (0.14 hp/lb)
- Takeoff (SL, ISA): 994 m (3,262 ft)

== See also ==
Aircraft of comparable role, configuration, and era

- Beechcraft Super King Air
- Beechcraft Starship
- NAL Saras

Related lists

- List of civil aircraft
