= Malcom Glenn =

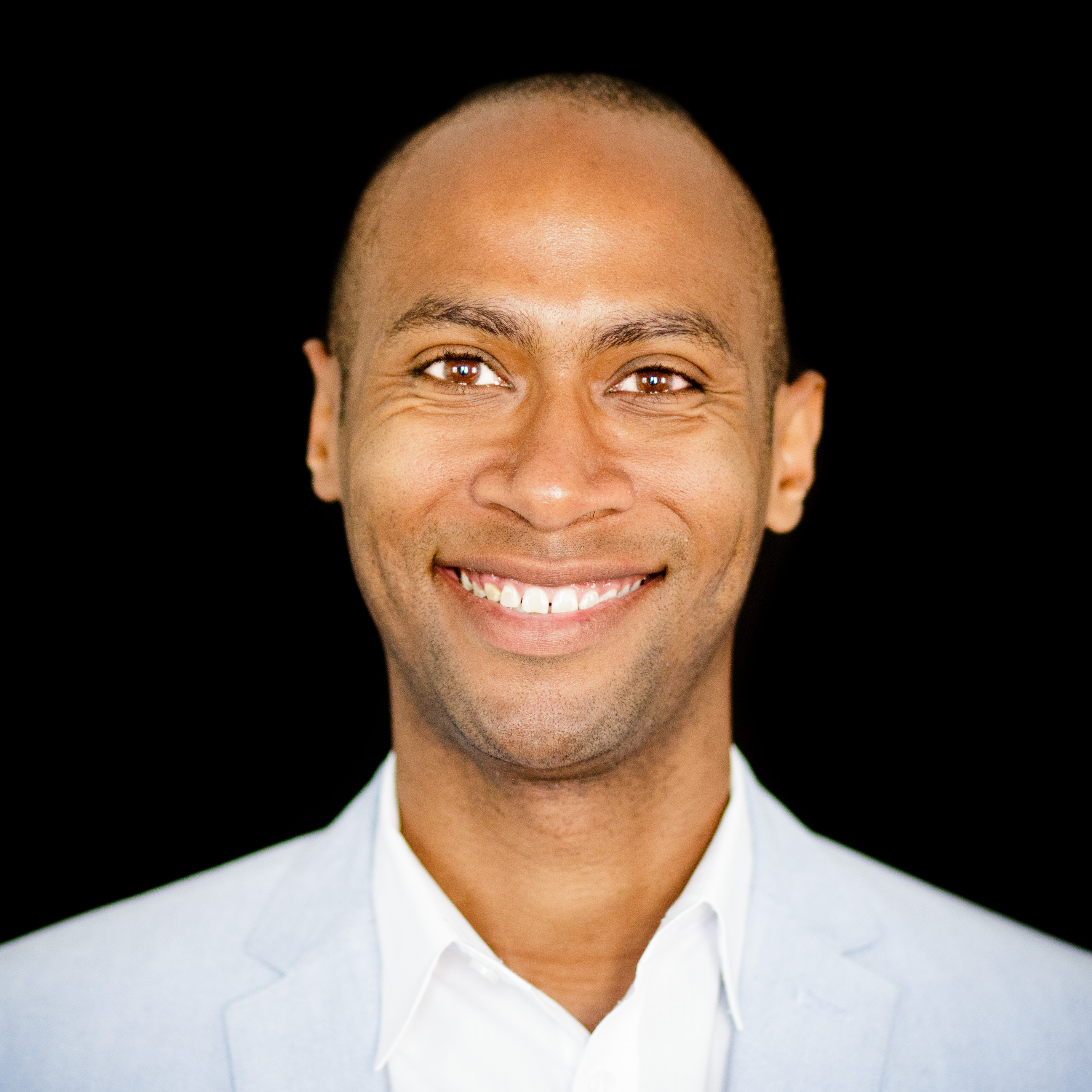
- Former President of Harvard Crimson
- Born: February 6, 1987 (age 39); Denver, Colorado, U.S.
- Education: Harvard College
- Occupations: Writer; Speaker; Public affairs specialist
- Website: www.malcomglenn.com

Malcom Glenn (born February 6, 1987, in Denver, Colorado) is an American writer and speaker and was The President of Harvard Crimson, the daily student newspaper of Harvard University, in 2008. He made national news as the first African American president of The Crimson in over a half-century.

Upon his election in November 2007, Glenn was featured in numerous publications, including The Denver Post, Essence Magazine, and The New York Observer.

== Early life ==
Glenn was born and raised in Denver, Colorado. He attended Thomas Jefferson High School, where he was editor-in-chief of the school newspaper, The Jefferson Journal. Glenn graduated from Harvard College in June 2009.

== Recent work ==
Glenn is currently Executive Director of the Seismic Foundation, a nonprofit that helps organizations lead communications and marketing campaigns to help educate the public on the importance of safe and responsible regulation of artificial intelligence. He previously worked at Uber in Washington D.C., where he focused on building strategic partnerships with community and nonprofit organizations. He also formerly worked in executive communications at Google, at an education advocacy organization in Washington, D.C., and at a Democratic polling/strategic consulting firm, Greenberg Quinlan Rosner. Following college, he became a contributor to The Huffington Post's Denver web site, writing about politics and local affairs.

He appeared in a number of publications and on television for his work related to both The Crimson and politics, particularly the youth vote. During the 2008 United States presidential campaign, Glenn covered the election for The Crimson, as well as for a joint venture in conjunction with CBS News and The Washington Post. During the 2008 Democratic National Convention in his native Denver, Glenn appeared on The CBS Early Show with host Harry Smith, and was also interviewed by CBS Evening News anchor Katie Couric during Couric's nightly Convention Webcast.

During the fall general election campaign, Glenn made a number of television and speaking appearances throughout the country. He was a guest on the Al Jazeera English network's Inside Story, a news program that airs daily on the 24-hour channel. He was also a panelist at an event titled Young, Black and Ready to Vote in St. Louis, Missouri, sponsored by the Center for American Progress’s campus outreach group, Campus Progress, and held prior to the 2008 United States vice-presidential debate. In late October, he moderated a panel at Harvard about Republican vice-presidential candidate Sarah Palin featuring, among others, GOP media consultant and CNN contributor Alex Castellanos. In April 2009, when Obama for America campaign manager David Plouffe was a visiting fellow at the Harvard Institute of Politics, Glenn moderated a panel with Plouffe at the IOP's John F. Kennedy Forum.

Glenn has written for The Denver Post and Sports Illustrated On Campus, and has been interviewed on Fox's local Boston television station, WFXT. In print, he has been interviewed by Newsweek, The Christian Science Monitor, and The Washington Post.
