= Fractional financing =

Fractional financing is a real estate investment structure that allows funding for multiple investors to collectively own a single property. Each investor owns a fraction or percentage of the property and receives a proportional share of the income and expenses generated by the property.

Fractional financing can take two forms: traditional timeshare ownership and larger share fractional ownership which is legally known as tenancy in common (TIC).

Fractional mortgages for shares of 1/26 ownership or 2 weeks or fewer are considered timeshare financing, and is often provided initially by the project developers. Larger shares of ownership is generally considered fractional ownership or tenancy in common and are provided by specialist mortgage providers.

Fractional financing is more difficult for most lenders since there is a small market for these loans, and no established secondary market for vacation finance mortgages of these types. Several companies make loans for fractional homes, yachts, planes and other properties.

== Relationship to real estate crowdfunding ==
Fractional financing is distinct from real estate crowdfunding, although both involve multiple investors contributing capital to a real estate asset. In fractional financing arrangements, investors typically acquire a direct ownership interest in a property through structures such as tenancy in common, with income and expenses allocated according to ownership shares. By contrast, real estate crowdfunding generally involves the purchase of securities issued through an intermediary platform, with investors obtaining an interest in an entity or project rather than direct title to the underlying property.

The growth of online investment platforms has increased the use of both models, particularly for smaller-scale investors seeking access to real estate assets with lower capital requirements. Despite some similarities, the legal rights, ownership structures, and regulatory treatment of fractional financing and crowdfunding investments may differ substantially.
