= Destination club =

Concept within the leisure industry

In the leisure industry, a destination club (also vacation club or travel club) is a form of timeshare system where members pay a membership deposit and annual dues to access the club's properties.

The concept was introduced in 1998, when Rob McGrath, a veteran of the luxury time share development business, launched Private Retreats. Since then, more than 30 companies have launched clubs targeting affluent families that want the benefits of second home ownership, but with more flexibility and choice in where they vacation each year. The use of a portfolio of high-end homes in resort destinations is said to be preferred by its members over access to a single golf course alone as appears to be the case with country clubs. In 2014, the world's largest destination club still in operation was "Inspirato with American Express".

Joining a destination club grants a member access to a collection of vacation homes in various locations around the world in exchange for a one-time membership fee and annual membership dues. Consistent with other vacation options, inventory can be booked based on availability. Some clubs allow members to purchase different membership-types which offer different levels of reservation priority, personalized services and resort amenities such as beach clubs, luxury spas and private chefs.

== Features ==
Benefits and access privileges vary by club. Offered by most clubs are:

- Access to private homes, town homes, condominiums or hotel units, typically on resort properties or near iconic resort locations.
- Usage rules vary between restricted travel (10–60 days) of home usage to unrestricted travel by club members.
- The ability to book homes in advance and on a "space available" basis, as well as a system to handle the demand for holiday or peak periods.
- High service levels including: pre-trip planning, on-location concierge services, and daily housekeeping service.
- Luxury furnishings and audio-visual equipment
- Additional membership privileges and benefits, including special club events, and access to resort amenities, spas and fitness centers.

== Membership models ==
While several variations exist, the basic choices range between equity, non-equity and next-generation clubs that differ from standard models. This is similar to the membership model choices at country clubs. In all models, club members provide an up-front sum and an annual fee though the exact amounts vary significantly by club-type.

=== Non-Equity Club ===
In non-equity clubs, members enjoy the hospitality benefits of the club, but don't own an interest in the homes and so are not impacted by the real estate appreciation or losses of the club's residence portfolio. The up-front payment is a deposit, and traditionally when they resign from the club, members receive 75% to 100% of that deposit back. However, in recent years, non-equity clubs have gotten away from refunds.

Exclusive Resorts, launched in 2002, is an example of this model. Members pay a joining fee that covers a number of travel nights per year. Exclusive Resorts exclusively owns each home in their portfolio. Each year, members commit to and pay for a certain number of nights at a flat rate. Members are only subject to refunds at a 3 to 1 basis, meaning a member will only receive a refund if three new members join.

=== Equity Club ===
With equity clubs, the up-front payment can be considered an investment of sorts (or at least a reduction in the opportunity cost of making the up-front payment), subject to typical investment risks. When exiting the club, the refund of that fee is adjusted to reflect changes to the value of the home portfolio or in the fee for new members. Various clubs have different ways of providing this benefit. Also, with an equity club, the members own the club's real estate portfolio, which provides additional security of the membership deposits.

The Hideaways Club, launched in 2007, is an example of this model. Members purchase a share of the property company that entitles them to nights or points redeemable as weeks throughout the year. The members therefore collectively own the properties through this property company, and the services provided to the members are operated through the operating company. At The Hideaways Club, members are subject to leaving the club on a 2 in 1 out basis, meaning a member can sell their share when another two members join with the same share type.

=== Managed and Controlled Club ===
During the real estate boom of the 2000s the equity model had appeal because members could benefit from the rapid appreciation of real estate assets. The economic changes between 2008-2011 resulted in innovation within the destination club marketplace and has provided more options for luxury travelers. The travel product and services available to members through a managed and controlled model are consistent with equity and non-equity clubs, but, because this model hinges on the club long-term leasing the properties in its portfolio as opposed to owning them, the cost of membership is significantly lower. Typically, members pay an up-front membership fee and an annual renewal fee and do not gain equity or appreciation. Members gain access to a portfolio of residences and members are able to book travel by paying below-market, members-only nightly rates as they travel. Unlike traditional equity-based travel clubs, travel clubs of this variety do not require a long-term commitment nor do members have to join a waiting list if they wish to revoke their membership.

Inspirato with American Express, launched in January 2011, is an example of this model.

== Properties and destinations ==
Destination clubs manage properties in destinations around the world. Clubs are subject to local rental home laws and ordinances regarding short-term home leases and nightly rentals. Mountain resort communities such as Vail, Aspen, Steamboat, Telluride and Sun Valley are hotbeds for club residences. Beach communities and island locations such as Rosemary Beach, Fort Lauderdale, Maui, Los Cabos, St Barts are also common. As traveler demand has increased clubs have added locations such as New York City, Chicago, Paris, London, Tuscany, Bordeaux, Patagonia, the Galapagos and Wine Country.

== Comparison to timeshares ==
When a person enter into a timeshare agreement, they pay for the right to use a vacation property for a specific length of time and with a specific frequency — for example, one week every year. Timeshare properties are located in resorts or condominiums in sought-after vacation destinations. Timeshare “owners” usually pay an initial fee to get into the timeshare agreement, plus regular maintenance fees and other charges later to continue ownership. With destination clubs, members pay each time for the cost of staying there. Destination clubs for the most part do not give members an ownership stake in real estate.

== History ==
Private Retreats launched the industry in 1998, with one club, Private Retreats, under the company name Preferred Retreats. The company was later renamed Tanner and Haley, with over 900 members in 2006.

In 2002 Brent Handler and Brad Handler founded Exclusive Resorts. The Handler brothers sold majority ownership of Exclusive Resorts to Steve Case in 2003. Exclusive Resorts will commemorate its 10th anniversary in 2013. To date, the club offers more than 350 residences around the globe in addition to providing its 3500 members with access to trips and events across all seven continents. Steve Case remains Chairman and majority shareholder of Exclusive Resorts. He is the former CEO of AOL.com.

Following the launch of Exclusive Resorts, from 2003 to 2006 entrepreneurs launched competitive clubs such as The Hideaways Club, Quintess, M Private Residences, Private Escapes, and Ultimate Resort. Specialty clubs joined the mix as well, for instance The Markers Club for golf and Emperum Club for both business and leisure travelers. Emperum Club has since restructured into a boutique travel company specializing in preferential rates on long stays. In 2009, a Fortune 200 company, Marriott International Inc. entered the market when they launched the Ritz-Carlton Destination Club.

Despite generally strong membership sales across the industry in the summer of 2006, Tanner & Haley Resorts entered Chapter 11 bankruptcy proceedings. As a group, members of that club lost more than $200 million in the bankruptcy. However, the real estate and members of Tanner and Haley were acquired by another destination club, Ultimate Resort. May 2008 Ultimate Resorts and Private Escapes merged to form Ultimate Escape. Ultimately, this led to the creation of several entities focused on consumer protection. The Destination Club Association was created to help govern the industry by the leading clubs and supported financial transparency by clubs and an increase in truth in advertising. Halogen Guides and SherpaReport serve as media outlets focusing on destination club coverage.

In 2011 Brent and Brad Handler re-entered the destination club marketplace with the launch of Denver-based Inspirato. On May 16, 2012, 16 months after opening, Inspirato announced it had surpassed the 10,000 vacation-night milestone in addition to servicing nearly 2,000 club members, receiving capital investments from Kleiner Perkins Caufield & Byers and Institutional Venture Partners, raising more than $1 million for charitable causes, and being named one of "America's Most Promising Companies" by Forbes magazine and "Best of the Best 2012: Vacation Homes" by Robb Report. In 2013, Inspirato announced a partnership with American Express, becoming "Inspirato with American Express". Inspirato is the first luxury destination club to enter into such a partnership with a major company. In April 2013, Inspirato with American Express launched "Inspirato for Business," a corporate offering for businesses to access Inspirato's homes for executive vacations, company meetings and retreats, and employee incentives and reward travel. In July 2013 Inspirato reached 4,000 members, making them the largest luxury destination club in the world, by number of members.

In December 2013, Inspirato announced it had combined with Portico Club, a destination club launched by Exclusive Resorts in 2012, joining the two fastest growing clubs in the industry. The newly combined club, which continues to operate under the name "Inspirato with American Express" and under the leadership of Inspirato CEO Brent Handler, will offer members more than 500 vacation choices in more than 100 destinations. As a result of the combination, Exclusive Resorts and its owner Revolution LLC received a minority stake in Inspirato, reuniting Brent and Brad Handler, the co-founders of Exclusive Resorts, with Exclusive Resorts' current Chairman, Steve Case.

== Deposits and legal action ==
The traditional Destination Club business model typically includes a refundable portion of the membership fee due to the member when they exit the club. Members who request to exit the club are subject to the terms of their Membership Agreement. The industry standard is 3 in 1 out: 1 member is allowed to exit the club for every 3 new members who join. The 3 in 1 out rule is designed to protect the club if it is deluged with members wanting to exit when there are no new members wanting to join. Since the economic downturn in 2008 the volume of equity club members complaining and requesting to exit destination clubs has increased dramatically prompting legal action in some instances: specific examples of this are a lawsuit against Ultimate Escapes LLC and the Exclusive Resorts Member Lawsuit.

Destination Clubs typically include contractual protections requiring liquidation after a certain period of time if not enough new members have joined to offset those resigning, in which case the liquidation proceeds are distributed to fulfill the refund requirements.

Some traditional destination clubs have attempted to reduce the risk of the 3 in 1 out rule by providing members with ownership and priority over other creditors, making fluctuations in the value of the club's residence portfolio an important consideration. The evolution from the traditional destination club model to next generation club has removed the 3 in 1 out rule entirely by allowing users to renew membership annually, exit the club at any time without penalty, and even offers a money-back guarantee to some new members.

== See also ==
- Fractional ownership
- Vacation home
- Vacation rental
- Holiday cottage
