= Thomas Jefferson High School (Denver) =

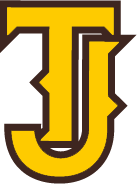
- Thomas Jefferson High School's Logo

Location
- 3950 South Holly Street; Denver, Colorado 80237; United States; 39°38′48″N 104°55′18″W

Information
- Type: Public secondary school
- Established: 1960 (66 years ago)
- School district: Denver Public Schools
- CEEB code: 060251
- Principal: Mike Christoff
- Teaching staff: 73.76 (on an FTE basis)
- Grades: 9-12
- Enrollment: 1,375 (2023–2024)
- Student to teacher ratio: 18.64
- Campus size: Medium
- Colors: Brown and gold
- Athletics: Football, lacrosse, soccer, cheerleading, swimming and diving, wrestling, softball, baseball, basketball, tennis, track and field, gymnastics, volleyball, cross country, golf
- Athletics conference: 4A/3A (Football Only)
- Mascot: Spartans
- Website: tjhs.dpsk12.org

Thomas Jefferson High School is a secondary school located in the Southmoor Park neighborhood, on the southeast side of Denver, Colorado, United States. It is operated under the Denver Public Schools. The school teams are the Spartans. The school and its athletic fields, both of which were built in 1960, are undergoing significant renovations.

== Demographics ==
As of 2021–2022 1,374 students were enrolled.

- 473 White
- 258 African American
- 47 Asian
- 7 Native American
- 6 Hawaiian Native/Pacific Islander
- 497 Latino or Hispanic
- 86 Two or More Races
- 634 Female
- 740 Male

Using federal government guidelines, 47% of the students were eligible for free or reduced-price lunch.

== Alumni ==
- Pierre Allen - (b 1987) retired NFL football defensive end.
- Michael Dinner - (b 1953) director, producer, and screenwriter for television. '80s hit The Wonder Years.
- Kyle Freeland - (b 1993) is a professional baseball pitcher for the Colorado Rockies
- Malcom Glenn - (b 1987) is a writer and speaker and was The President of The Harvard Crimson
- Daniel Graham - (b 1978) is a former NFL tight end for Denver Broncos
- Jim Gray - (b 1959) is a sportscaster currently with Showtime
- Tyler Green - (b 1970), is a former MLB pitcher, who played for Philadelphia Phillies
- Brad Handler - (b 1967) is an entrepreneur and attorney.
- Brent Handler - (b 1969) is an entrepreneur who works in the destination club industry.
- Kristina M. Johnson - (b 1957) is an American business executive, engineer, academic, and former government official.
- Chaney Kley - (1972-2007) was an actor known for his role in Darkness Falls.
- DeWayne Lewis - (b 1985) is an NFL cornerback who played for Cincinnati Bengals.
- Derrick Martin - (b 1985) is an NFL safety who played for Baltimore Ravens.
- Jovan Melton - Colorado State Representative - House District 41, House Majority Deputy Whip
- John Stearns - (1951–2022), nicknamed "Bad Dude", was a All-Star MLB professional baseball catcher and coach for the New York Mets.
- John Trahan - (b 1961), is a former NFL wide receiver for Kansas City Chiefs
- Barney Visser - (b 1949) is an entrepreneur and author and owner and driver in NASCAR
- Michael Winslow - (b 1958) is an actor, comedian and beatboxer known for the Police Academy films.
- Andre Woolfolk - (b 1980) is a retired NFL cornerback for the Tennessee Titans.
- Leni Wylliams - (1961–1996) was a dancer, choreographer, artistic director and master teacher.
- Wendy Lucero-Schayes - (b 1963) is a former Olympic diver and TV commentator.
- George DiCarlo - (b 1963) is a former Olympic Gold Medalist swimmer.
