= Derrick Martin =

American football player (born 1985)

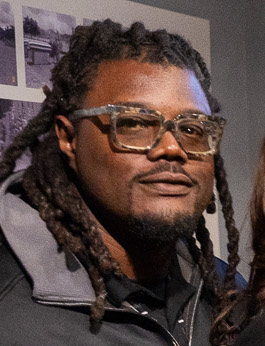
- Martin in 2025

No. 29, 22, 26, 39
- Position: Safety

Personal information
- Born: May 16, 1985 (age 41); Westminster, Colorado, U.S.
- Listed height: 5 ft 10 in (1.78 m)
- Listed weight: 198 lb (90 kg)

Career information
- High school: Thomas Jefferson (Denver, Colorado)
- College: Wyoming
- NFL draft: 2006: 6th round, 208th overall pick

Career history
- Baltimore Ravens (2006−2008); Green Bay Packers (2009−2010); New York Giants (2011); New England Patriots (2012); Chicago Bears (2013)

Awards and highlights
- 2× Super Bowl champion (XLV, XLVI); Second-team All-MW (2004)

Career NFL statistics
- Total tackles: 100
- Sacks: 1.0
- Fumble recoveries: 1
- Interceptions: 3
- Stats at Pro Football Reference

Derrick Jerome Martin (born May 16, 1985) is an American former professional football player who was a safety in the National Football League (NFL). He played college football for the Wyoming Cowboys and was selected by the Baltimore Ravens in the sixth round of the 2006 NFL draft.

He also played for the Green Bay Packers, New York Giants, New England Patriots, and Chicago Bears. With the Packers, he won Super Bowl XLV over the Pittsburgh Steelers and the following year with the Giants, he won Super Bowl XLVI over the Patriots.

== Early life ==
Martin attended Thomas Jefferson High School in Denver, CO where he led his team to the quarter-final stage of the 2001 state playoffs and also the 2002 state semifinals. Martin also excelled at basketball where he was team captain. He was named Gatorade Player of the Year as a senior.

== College career ==
Martin was recruited to play football for the Wyoming Cowboys by head coach Joe Glenn and his coaching staff.

As a Wyoming Cowboy, he became an immediate contributor as a defensive back his freshman season, recovering a blocked punt and running it into the end zone for a touchdown in the season opener against Montana State.

Martin earned Second-team All-Conference honors as a sophomore, and helped lead the Wyoming Cowboys to a win over a heavily favored UCLA team by a score of 24-21 in the Las Vegas Bowl.

At the end of Martin’s junior season in 2005, he made the decision to enter the NFL Draft.

Martin played in a total of 30 games, making 24 starts and finishing his college career with 134 tackles and six interceptions.

== Professional career ==
Pre-draft measurables
Height	Weight	Arm length	Hand span	40-yard dash	10-yard split	20-yard split	20-yard shuttle	Three-cone drill	Vertical jump	Broad jump	Bench press
5 ft 10 in (1.78 m)	202 lb (92 kg)	30 1/2 in (0.77 m)	8 7/8 in (0.23 m)	4.50 s	1.56 s	2.57 s	3.95 s	6.72 s	40.0 in (1.02 m)	10 ft 7 in (3.23 m)	17 reps
All values from NFL Combine

=== Baltimore Ravens ===
Martin was selected by the Baltimore Ravens in the sixth round (208th overall) in the 2006 NFL draft. He was the first-ever player to be selected by the Ravens out of the University of Wyoming. In his rookie season, he played in eight games posting four tackles. He made his NFL debut versus the Carolina Panthers on October 15. In the 2007 season, he made 32 tackles.

=== Green Bay Packers ===
On September 5, 2009, Martin was traded to the Green Bay Packers for tackle Tony Moll. He was the Packers' Special Team ace in the 2009 season and was one of the Packers' two Special Teams captains (along with linebacker Desmond Bishop) in Green Bay's playoff loss at Arizona.

Martin was placed on injured reserve when he sustained a knee injury against the Washington Redskins on October 10, 2010. Martin also recorded an interception, which he returned 15 yards that season.

On March 2, 2011, Martin was released by the Packers.

=== New York Giants ===
Derrick Martin signed with the New York Giants on August 15, 2011. He got his second Super Bowl championship in a row when the Giants defeated the New England Patriots in Super Bowl XLVI. Following the season, he became an unrestricted free agent.

=== New England Patriots ===
On August 4, 2012, Martin signed with the New England Patriots. Martin was released by the Patriots on August 31, 2012 during final cuts, and was re-signed by the Patriots on October 31, 2012.

=== Chicago Bears ===
On August 11, 2013, Martin signed with the Chicago Bears but was released on August 25. He was brought back by the Bears on November 13 after Charles Tillman was placed on injured reserve. Martin appeared in seven games in 2013 for the Bears, recording a tackle on defense and six on special teams. Martin was a free agent after 2013, but on February 24, 2014, he signed a one-year deal with Chicago. He was waived on May 28, 2014.

== NFL career statistics ==
Legend
**Bold**	Career high

=== Regular season ===
Year	Team	Games		Tackles					Interceptions					Fumbles			
Year	Team	GP	GS	Cmb	Solo	Ast	Sck	TFL	Int	Yds	TD	Lng	PD	FF	FR	Yds	TD
2006	BAL	8	0	5	4	1	0.0	0	0	0	0	0	0	0	0	0	0
2007	BAL	**16**	**3**	**40**	**32**	**8**	0.0	0	**2**	3	0	3	**7**	0	**1**	0	0
2008	BAL	4	0	1	1	0	0.0	0	0	0	0	0	0	0	0	0	0
2009	GNB	14	1	25	20	5	0.0	0	0	0	0	0	0	0	0	0	0
2010	GNB	5	0	9	6	3	0.0	0	1	**15**	0	**15**	1	0	0	0	0
2011	NYG	14	0	12	8	4	0.0	0	0	0	0	0	0	0	0	0	0
2012	NWE	5	0	5	4	1	**1.0**	**1**	0	0	0	0	0	0	0	0	0
2013	CHI	7	0	3	2	1	0.0	0	0	0	0	0	0	0	0	0	0
		73	4	100	77	23	1.0	1	3	18	0	15	8	0	1	0	0

=== Playoffs ===
Year	Team	Games		Tackles					Interceptions					Fumbles			
Year	Team	GP	GS	Cmb	Solo	Ast	Sck	TFL	Int	Yds	TD	Lng	PD	FF	FR	Yds	TD
2011	NYG	**4**	0	**1**	**1**	0	0.0	0	0	0	0	0	0	0	0	0	0
		4	0	1	1	0	0.0	0	0	0	0	0	0	0	0	0	0

== Home invasion ==
On January 20, 2013, Martin's home was invaded while he was out with his team at the AFC Championship game where the Baltimore Ravens defeated the Patriots 28-13; two masked men back-forced their way into Martin's home in Aurora and held his wife Alexa Martin, and their three children at gunpoint. The police did not get a good enough description of the suspects to pursue a case. Police spokeswoman Cassidee Carlson said the suspects took some valuables, but wouldn't go into further detail about what was taken.
