= Brent Handler =

American businessperson

- Born: October 21, 1968 (age 57); Denver, Colorado
- Education: Thomas Jefferson High School (Denver)
- Alma mater: University of Colorado at Boulder
- Occupation: CEO
- Board member of: LIFE Properties International, Carmel Classic Foundation
- Spouse: Kirsten Handler

Brent Handler (born October 21, 1968) is an American entrepreneur recognized for his contributions to the luxury travel and real estate industries. He is the co-founder and former CEO of Inspirato, a luxury travel subscription company listed on NASDAQ under the ticker symbol ISPO. In 2002, Handler co-founded Exclusive Resorts with his brother Brad, serving as president until 2009. Under their leadership, the company grew to over 3,250 members and nearly 400 residences worldwide.

In 2010, Handler co-founded Inspirato, aiming to provide luxury travel experiences without the substantial upfront costs typical of traditional destination clubs. The company has since become a significant player in the industry, offering curated vacation options to its members.

Handler is also involved in philanthropic efforts. These efforts focus on education, youth development, and community engagement.

== Personal life ==
Handler was born on October 21, 1968, in Denver, Colorado, the son of Suzanne and Norton Handler. Norton Handler owned a series of clothing manufacturers and shared his passion for entrepreneurism and real estate with both Brent and his older brother, Brad, during their early years. Handler attended Thomas Jefferson High School (Denver), where he played tennis and basketball, and graduated in 1987. He earned his undergraduate business degree from the University of Colorado at Boulder in 1991.

In 1995, Handler married Kirsten Sweetman. They have three children.

Brother, Brad Handler, went on to become the first in-house attorney at eBay and later joined Brent as a partner in his entrepreneurial pursuits.

=== Exclusive Resorts ===
In 2002, along with his brother Brad and a friend, Brent Handler co-founded destination club Exclusive Resorts. He was the company's president from 2002 through 2009, a period of great innovation and growth that led to Exclusive Resorts becoming the recognized industry leader. In 2004, the Handlers sold majority ownership of Exclusive Resorts to businessman Steve Case. By the end of 2009, Exclusive Resorts claimed over 3,250 members, nearly 400 homes, and delivered nearly 100,000 completed vacations. In 2006, Handler was named a finalist for the Denver Business Journal's Entrepreneur of the Year award for his success building Exclusive Resorts.

=== Inspirato ===
In January 2011, along with his brother, Brad Handler, Martin Pucher and Brian Corbett, Brent Handler re-entered the destination club marketplace with the launch of the Denver-based destination club Inspirato. Brent Handler currently serves as the company's CEO. In a departure from the traditional destination club model, Inspirato rents rather than owns its homes, reducing the club's upfront costs and allowing for lower membership fees. Handler's innovative business model and past success in the destination club space led to significant interest from the venture capital community. The company raised $65 million from some of the world's top venture capital firms, including Kleiner Perkins Caufield & Byers and Institutional Venture Partners. Forbes magazine named Inspirato one of "America’s Most Promising Companies" in November 2011 and Robb Report included the club in its "Best of the Best 2012" list. On May 16, 2012, 16 months after opening, Inspirato announced it had acquired nearly 2,000 club members. In October 2012, Inspirato was recognized as a “Denver Gazelle” by the Denver Office of Economic Development for its successful track record of demonstrating innovation while raising significant investment capital in today's business environment. The company has also received attention for the success of its innovative philanthropic program, Inspired Giving. Since October 2012, the company has helped raise over $2 million for nonprofit organizations, schools and hospitals across the country, including March of Dimes and National Children's Cancer Society, by providing vacation homes for auction at fundraising events.

== Boards ==
Handler serves as an advisory board member of the Andre Agassi Foundation for Education.
