= Jan Roskam =

American aircraft designer (1930–2022)

Dr. Jan Roskam
- Born: February 22, 1930
- Died: September 9, 2022 (aged 92)
- Occupations: Engineer, professor

Jan Roskam (February 22, 1930 – September 9, 2022) was a Dutch-born American aircraft designer. He was the Deane E. Ackers Distinguished Professor of Aerospace Engineering at the University of Kansas. He was also the author of eleven books on airplane design and flight dynamics and over 160 papers on the topics of aircraft aerodynamics, performance, design and flight controls. He founded the company DARcorporation with Willem Anemaat.

== Biography ==
=== Early life and education ===
Born in The Hague on February 22, 1930, Roskam received his engineer's degree in aeronautical engineering in 1954 from the Delft University of Technology followed by a Ph.D. degree from the University of Washington in aeronautics and astronautics in 1965.

=== Professional career ===
Roskam has been involved in the design and development of 36 aircraft programs, including 12 which made it to flight, while working for three major aircraft companies. He was actively involved in design and development of the Boeing SST, Cessna Citation I, and Learjet 35. He also acted as a consultant on the Boeing 747. He was particularly proud of his work on the Piaggio P-180 Avanti.

=== Work on the Piaggio P-180 Avanti ===
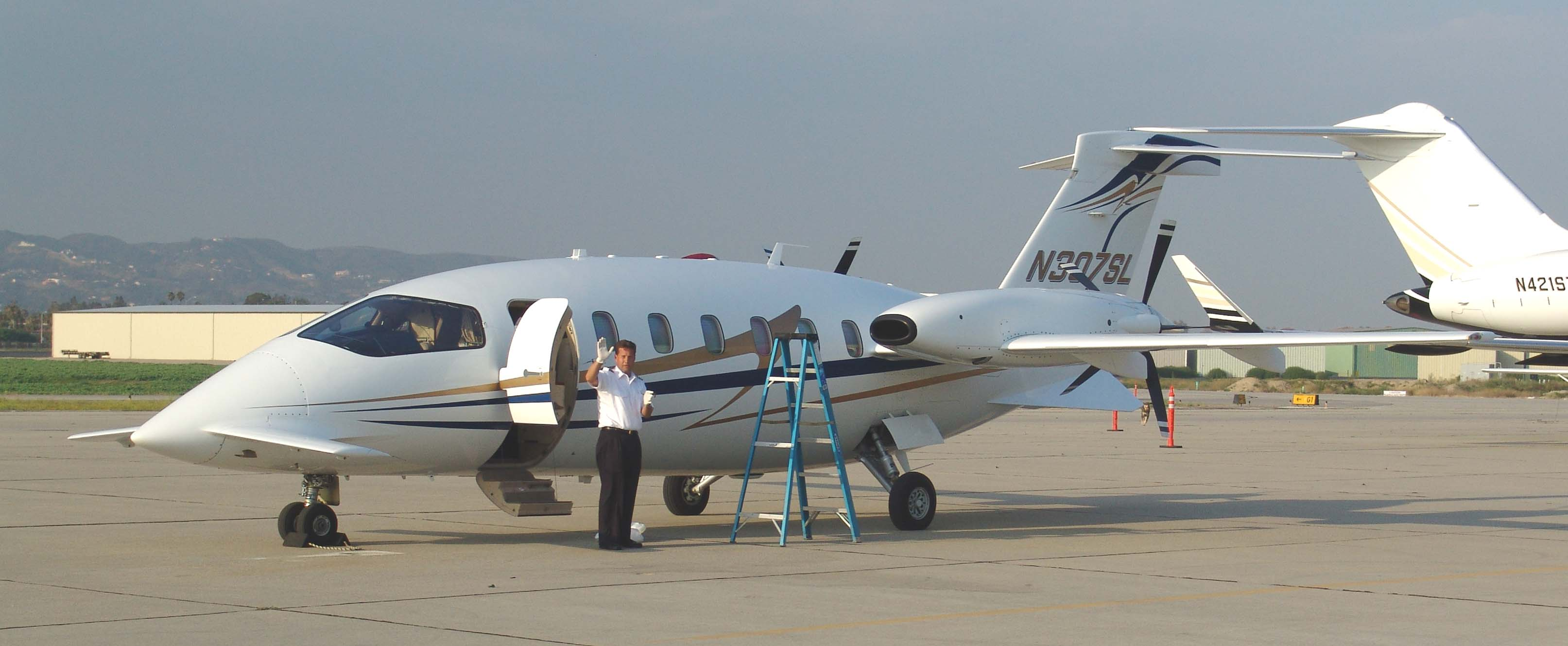
Roskam is proudest of his work with the Piaggio P-180 Avanti

In 1967 he became a Professor of Aerospace Engineering at the University of Kansas. He served as chairman of the department from 1972 to 1976 and was recognized as the Ackers Distinguished Professor of Aerospace Engineering from 1974 until his retirement in 2003. During his time at the university he continued to serve as a member of various advisory committees to NASA and was a member of the X-29 future applications committee. He was involved in founding the Aerospace Short Course program at the University of Kansas in 1977, which has grown into a center for aerospace professional development and training, and he still teaches for the program.

In 1991, Roskam co-founded the Design, Analysis and Research Corporation (DARcorporation) with Willem Anemaat in Lawrence, Kansas. He served as the company's president until 2004. The main focus of the company is design consultation, software and textbooks in the aviation field. The company developed its own aircraft design software, Advanced Aircraft Analysis (AAA), as well as a second design program for a NASA Small Business Innovative Research contract.

In 2002 he published Roskam's Airplane War Stories a collection of stories about airplane design and analysis and engineering mistakes that were made. Many of the stories are based on his own experiences and have previously been used to demonstrate to young engineers that "when we make mistakes, we kill people". Roskam has written eleven books on airplane design and flight dynamics.

Shortly before his retirement in 2003, Roskam received the Chancellor's Club Award for his career in teaching, recognizing his exceptional teaching history. His former students include Alan Mulally, former president and CEO of Boeing Commercial Airplanes. Mulally calls Roskam one of his heroes and notes that he learned important skills such as team-building during Roskam's courses. Roskam is also credited with helping Mulally get his first job at Boeing.

The American Institute of Aeronautics and Astronautics honored him with the AIAA Aircraft Design Award in 2007. The award is given each year for advancements in the area of aircraft design, in Roskam's case the award was to recognize his lifetime contribution to the fields of airplane and configuration design and education.

=== Death ===
Roskam died on September 9, 2022, at the age of 92.

== Works ==
=== Books ===
- Airplane Design

- Part I: Preliminary Sizing of Airplanes (1985)
- Part II: Preliminary Configuration Design and Integration of the Propulsion System (1985)
- Part III: Layout Design of Cockpit, Fuselage, Wing and Empennage: Cutaways and Inboard Profiles (1986)
- Part IV: Layout of Landing Gear and Systems (1986)
- Part V: Component Weight Estimation (1985)
- Part VI: Preliminary Calculation of Aerodynamic, Thrust and Power Characteristics (1987)
- Part VII: Determination of Stability, Control and Performance Characteristics: FAR and Military Requirements (1986)
- Part VIII: Airplane Cost Estimation: Design, Development, Manufacturing and Operating (1990)

- Airplane Flight Dynamics and Automatic Flight Controls I-II (1995)
- Airplane Aerodynamics and Performance with Dr. Chuan-Tau Edward Lan (1997)
- Roskam's Airplane War Stories: An Account of the Professional Life and Work of Dr. Jan Roskam, Airplane Designer and Teacher (2002)
- Lessons Learned in Aircraft Design (2007)

== Awards ==
- AIAA Piper Award (1986) for "outstanding contributions to the design of general aviation airplanes as an author, educator, consultant and researcher"
- AIAA Atwood Award (1987) for "outstanding contributions in aerospace education particularly in the areas of design and flight dynamics, and for his contributions to the understanding of interior noise transmission, the development of three surface aircraft and the use of natural laminar flow"
- Chancellor's Club Career Teaching Award (2003)
- AIAA Aircraft Design Award (2007) for "lifetime achievement in airplane design, airplane design education, configuration design, and flight dynamics education"
- Higuchi/Endowment Research Achievement Award
- Ned N. Fleming Trust Award for excellence in teaching
- Governor of Kansas General Aviation Award
- University of Kansas 2016 Distinguished Engineering Service Award

== Professional organization memberships ==
- American Institute of Aeronautics and Astronautics (AIAA) - Fellow
- Society of Automotive Engineers (SAE) - Fellow
- Royal Aeronautical Society - Associate Fellow
