= Brad Handler =

American entrepreneur and attorney (born 1967)

- Born: July 19, 1967 (age 59); Denver, Colorado, U.S.
- Education: Thomas Jefferson High School
- Alma mater: University of Pennsylvania (BA, BS)
- Occupation: Chairman
- Employer: Inspirato
- Board member of: New Moon
- Website: inspirato.com

Brad Handler (born July 19, 1967) is an American entrepreneur and attorney best known for his success in the destination club industry and his role as the first in-house attorney at eBay. He is a founder and chairman of Inspirato, a private, luxury destination club. In 2002, along with his brother Brent Handler, he founded Exclusive Resorts, where he served as chairman, CEO and vice-chairman. He served as eBay's in-house attorney from 1997 to 2001. He is based in Palo Alto, California.

== Personal life and education ==
Handler was born July 19, 1967, in Denver, Colorado, the son of Suzanne and Norton Handler. He has one sibling, younger brother Brent Handler. He attended Thomas Jefferson High School (Denver), where he played tennis and competed on the debate team, and graduated in 1985. He earned a Bachelor of Arts degree in history from the College of Arts & Sciences at the University of Pennsylvania and a Bachelor of Science degree in economics from The Wharton School of the University of Pennsylvania in 1989. In 1995, he earned a Juris Doctor from the University of Virginia School of Law, where he served as the managing editor of the Virginia Law Review from 1994 to 1995. In 2000, Handler helped establish the University of Virginia School of Law's Law and Technology Initiative Fund in support of research, scholarship and entrepreneurial activity.

== Early career ==
From 1989 to 1990, Handler worked as a consultant for American Management Systems. From 1990 to 1992, Handler worked as a technical review specialist at Apple Inc. After graduating from law school, he worked for two years as an associate at Cooley Godward LLP.

== eBay ==
In October 1997, Handler joined eBay after being recruited to run their business development group but convincing them they needed an in-house attorney. As eBay's first in-house lawyer, Handler was responsible for eBay's user agreement, privacy policy and eBay's government relations group. He was also instrumental in the establishment of the eBay Foundation in 1998, creating the first framework for allocating pre-IPO shares into a company foundation. Handler left his full-time position at eBay in December 2001, but continued as a consultant for another 18 months.

== Exclusive Resorts ==
In 2002, Handler and his brother Brent, along with Tom Filippini, founded destination club Exclusive Resorts after coming up with the idea while sitting on the beach together in Hawaii. Brad Handler served as the company's chairman, CEO and vice-chairman between 2002 and 2009, a period of great innovation and growth that led to Exclusive Resorts becoming the recognized industry leader. In 2004, the Handler brothers sold majority ownership of Exclusive Resorts to Steve Case. By the end of 2009, Exclusive Resorts claimed over 3,250 members, nearly 400 homes, and delivered nearly 100,000 completed vacations. Brad Handler stepped down from his role on the Exclusive Resorts’ board of directors in 2011.

== Inspirato ==
In January 2011, Brent and Brad Handler re-entered the destination club marketplace with the launch of Denver-based Inspirato, along with co-founders Martin Pucher and Brian Corbett. Brad Handler is the company's chairman. In a departure from the traditional destination club model, Inspirato engages in long-term leases rather than buying their homes, greatly reducing the club's investment costs and allowing for lower membership fees.

Under the Handlers’ leadership, Inspirato experienced early success and interest from the venture capital community. The company raised $65 million from venture capital firms including Kleiner Perkins Caufield & Byers and Institutional Venture Partners. Forbes magazine named Inspirato one of "America’s Most Promising Companies" in November 2011 and Robb Report included the club in its "Best of the Best 2012" list. On May 16, 2012, 16 months after opening, Inspirato announced it had acquired nearly 2,000 club members. The company has also been active philanthropically, helping raise over $1.5 million, as of August 2012, for nonprofit organizations, schools and hospitals across the country by providing vacation homes for auction at fundraising events.

== Other ==
In addition to his entrepreneurial pursuits, Handler is a lecturer at Stanford Law School and the University of Virginia School of Law. He is a board member of New Moon Girls magazine. He is also an active angel investor and is credited with numerous patents. Handler is a contributor to Forbes.com.
