= Fractional renting =

Fractional or weekday renting is renting on a part-time basis, typically renting a room in someone's home for the working week.

== Benefits ==
The growth in popularity of weekday renting in the UK has arisen as individuals' work requirements draw them away from their homes, lengthening commuting distances and journey times. Busy people, tired of long distance commuting, look for somewhere to rent close to work so they can stay away during the working week and improve their work–life balance.

Simultaneously, financial pressures on homeowners have led to a rise in the number of people offering rooms for working week renting. Taking a weekday lodger provides additional income but leaves the homeowner with a spare room for the weekend.

Weekday renting services facilitate the linking of homeowners and lodgers.
