= Wine Country (disambiguation) =

Wine Country most commonly refers to California's Wine Country, in the northern San Francisco Bay Area.

Wine Country may also refer to:

- Woodinville wine country, an area north of Seattle that features some of Washington State's largest and oldest wineries
- List of wine-producing regions, a list of areas in the world where wine grapes are produced that may colloquially be referred to as "Wine Country"
- Wine Country Radio, network of radio stations in Northern California's wine country
- Wine Country (film), a 2019 American comedy film
