= Fractional ownership =

Method in which several unrelated parties can share in

Fractional ownership is a method in which several unrelated parties can share in, and mitigate the risk of, ownership of a high-value tangible asset, usually a jet, yacht or piece of resort real estate. It can be done for strictly monetary reasons, but typically there is some amount of personal access involved. One of the main motivators for a fractional purchase is the ability to share the costs of maintaining an asset that will not be used full-time by one owner.

Every fractional endeavour requires some sort of management, to administer the rules and regulations (which are agreed upon before the fraction is purchased) and maintain the asset to the degree laid out in the ownership documents. Generally, management will oversee the daily operation of more than one property, although it is not necessary. A single fractional asset may be managed by a single entity. Each owner is guaranteed a prescribed amount of access to the asset, which typically can be used or offered to the public as rental or charter, the income is usually split between the management company and the fractional owner, unless the owner finds the renter himself. Additionally, each owner pays a portion of the annual management fees and maintenance, relative to the percent of ownership.

In business, fractional ownership is a percentage share of an expensive asset. Shares are sold to individual owners. Typically, a company manages the asset on behalf of the owners, who pay monthly/annual fees for the management plus variable (e.g., per-hour, per-day) use fees. For rapidly depreciating assets, the management company may sell the asset and distribute the proceeds back to the owners, who can then claim a capital loss and optionally purchase a fraction of a new asset.

Whether fractional ownership provides a financial advantage over renting is an ongoing debate, and some countries and regions have tax laws that provide additional benefits for owners, such as capital-loss allowances, while others might penalize ownership over renting.

== Aviation ==
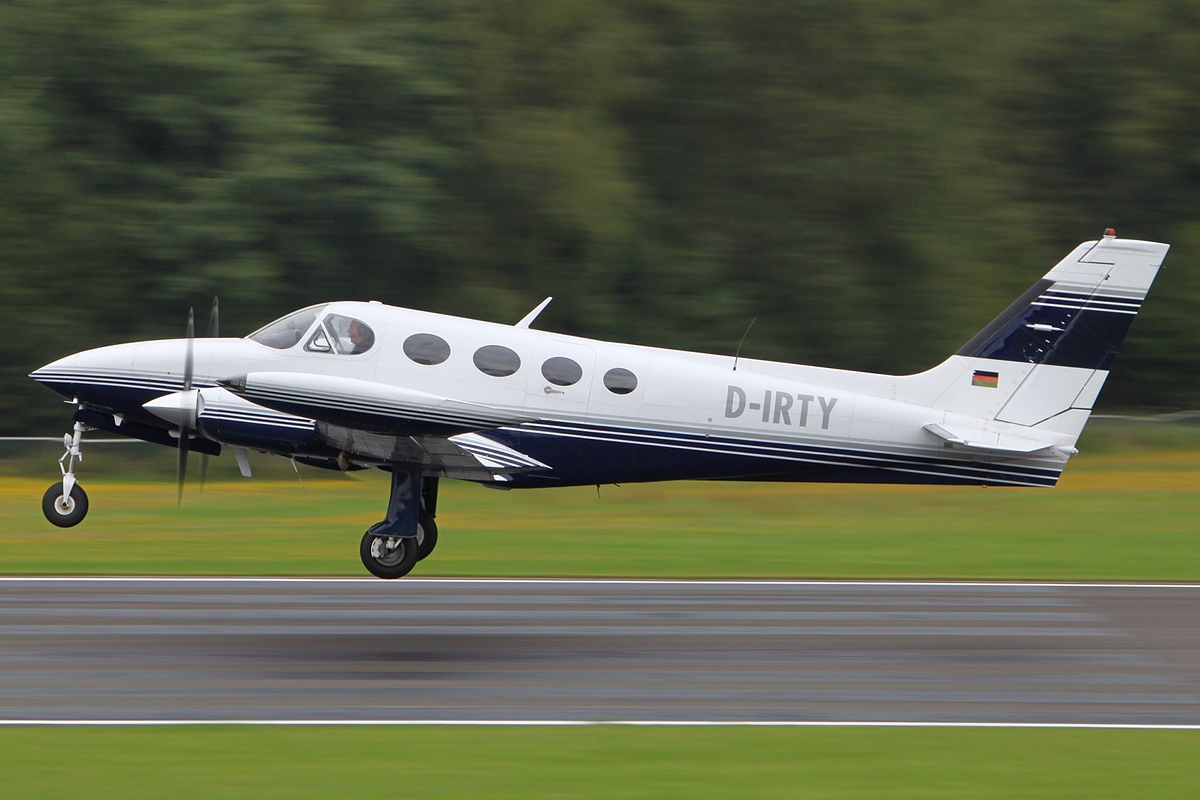
Cessna 340A

Fractional ownership offers an individual or company the option to purchase a share of an aircraft. Shares from as little as 1/16 of an aircraft, which offers approximately 37.5 hours of flight time per year, to 1/2 of an aircraft can be purchased, depending on the needs of the operator. The most common amounts purchased usually range from about 1/8 to 1/4 (75 to 150 flight hours per year) of an aircraft. Though the owner takes title of the portion of their investment, they are not assigned to a dedicated aircraft for usage. Instead, they are given access to a pool of similar aircraft, and therefore, theoretically, an owner may never actually fly on their titled jet.

Co-owners (referred to as 'owners') of a fractional program's aircraft are required to pay a percentage of the aircraft's purchase price that is proportionate to the number of hours they wish to fly per year, for the duration of their contract—typically 5 years. In addition to the price, there are fees charged for all occupied flight hours (that fluctuate with changes in fuel prices), as well as monthly fixed-management fees that cover maintenance and administration of the program. In return, the customer receives a predetermined number of hours in the aircraft of their choice, based on the owner's needs and the amount they are willing to pay. Fractional owners are guaranteed that this aircraft, or another aircraft of the same model or comparable aircraft type, will be available 24 hours a day, 365 days per year, with as little as four hours' notice. In addition, the management company provides all scheduling, flight planning, staffing, catering, maintenance, communications, and insurance services. A fractional owner simply picks up the phone, calls a dispatcher, requests a flight, and drives to the airport.

=== History ===
The term fractional ownership originally became popular for business jets. Richard Santulli of NetJets pioneered the concept of allowing businesses to purchase shares in a jet to reduce costs. With a fractional jet plan, members will typically fly in any jet available, not necessarily the one in which they own shares. The management company will reposition jets as necessary and provide flight crews. Companies with greater needs purchase larger shares to get access to more time.

The fractional ownership concept has since been extended to smaller aircraft and now has become common for single-engine piston aircraft like the Cirrus SR22, which are beyond the financial means of many private pilots. The same concepts apply, except that the management company may not provide flight crews nor reposition the aircraft.

Many pilots get together to buy light aircraft in a privately bought and managed fractional ownership, this is often known as group flying.

Fractional ownership has played a significant role in revitalizing the general aviation manufacturing industry since the late 1990s, and most manufacturers actively support fractional ownership programs.

== Fractional property ownership ==
Fractional ownership simply means the division of any asset into portions or shares. If the "asset" is a property, the title or deed can be legally divided into shares. In certain instances this is done by creating a "mezzanine structure", i.e., creating a company which owns the property then allowing multiple owners or investors to own shares in the company. Those shares can then be purchased and owned by more than one individual. The reasons for a "mezzanine structure" can vary. Two common reasons are to allow transfer of shares without the need to reflect changes on the title or deed to the property, and for tax benefits.

Another type of fractional ownership, not part of a securitized business plan is Tenancy in Common, which is grounded in the real property laws of most, if not all states. The main difference is there is no right of survivorship to the sponsor or other owners if one or more of owners were to pass away. Where there are similarities with the equal sharing of operational expenses, rental income and access, the striking difference is free transferability of the owner's interest in the property without regard to the other owners in the property.

Shared ownership of the property and its deed will also entitle shareholders to certain usage rights, usually in the form of weeks. Conceptually, fractional ownership is not the same as timeshare. Fractional ownership affords much of the freedom and usage benefits offered in timeshare; however, the fundamental difference with fractional ownership is that the purchaser owns part of the title (as opposed to units of "time"). Therefore, if the property appreciates (or depreciates) in value, then so do the shares. As with whole ownership, fractional owners can sell whenever they deem necessary or prudent, releasing the capital growth from their "bricks & mortar" investment.

== Real property ==
The practice of joining together with family and friends to share ownership of vacation property has been around for many years. But the fractional property industry started in the U.S. in the Rocky Mountains ski resorts in the early 1990s. These first fractional developments recognized that people did not want to buy whole homes, which they would use only for a few weeks a year in the mountains. According to research firm Ragatz Associates, there were over 312 fractional developments in North America in 2017. The U.S. Mountain region has the majority of active fractional property available, with the U.S. Pacific region next. The prevalent leisure activity for owners of fractional property in the U.S. Mountain region is skiing. In 2018, the most common fractional size available for purchase in North America is a one-fourth ownership, giving owners three months of total annual visit usage.

Outside the USA a non-commercial form of fractional ownership has been in existence for several decades. In this form, otherwise unconnected individuals (rather than family or friends) form private syndicates to purchase, for example, vacation property or boats. These syndicates operate as private member groups with small numbers on a non-profit basis, generally just sharing expenses and usage. These groups can involve assets ranging from modest apartments or condominium-type properties to multimillion euro/dollar properties, and leverage their ability to make collective purchases of additional assets such as boats or vehicles as additional facilities while retaining control entirely within the membership of the group.

The popularity of the term fractional ownership has caused extensive rebranding in other industries where similar concepts, such as real estate timeshares, were already well established. The main distinction between timeshare and fractional ownership is that a timeshare is a right to use, but with fractional ownership is a deeded piece of real estate, just not for the entire parcel.

Fractional ownership divides a property into more affordable segments for individuals and also matches an individual's ownership time to their actual usage time. A fractional share gives the owners certain privileges, such as a number of days or weeks when they can use the property. Occasionally, the property is sold after a predetermined time, distributing the relative proceeds back to the owners. A few private owner-groups have developed highly sophisticated usage allocation schemes and other features based on the principle of attempting to get as close as possible to the flexibility of individual ownership, and only compromising this to the minimum extent necessary to accommodate multiple owners. In such schemes, the basic agreement is between the members themselves, whereas in most commercial fractional ownership schemes, the owner's principal relationship is with the property developer and/or promoter of the scheme.

=== Private residence clubs ===
Private residence clubs are the luxury, high end of the fractional property market. The research firm Ragatz Associates defines a private residence club as a fractional property that sells at a price of US$1,000 per square foot or higher. Private residence clubs provide the services and amenities of five-star hotels, and some of the luxury hotel groups run their own clubs. Occasionally, membership in a private residence club grants to its member only the right to usage of the club properties and services, without ownership rights in the properties themselves. Note that a private residence club is different from a destination club, although the terms are sometimes used interchangeably.

In addition to luxury private residence clubs, single "stand-alone" vacation homes and condos can be converted to fractional ownership. This fractional home conversion process can be accomplished by any knowledgeable seller or through a fractional consulting company. The benefit of fractional home conversion includes the ability of the homeowner to keep a portion of the ownership for themselves, pay off debt and reduce expenses.

A key aspect for any fractional owner is to understand their usage rights and the reservation plans. These vary from property to property. Some offer fixed occupancy periods in which an owner uses the same time each year. Some offer "floating" periods, in which the occupancy times rotate throughout the year, and some offer a mixture of these, with some time fixed and some floating.

Another variation in the business model is what are called "destination resorts". These are typically properties, whether hotel rooms, suites, or freestanding villas, located on property owned and managed by a hotel developer, and which provide amenities typically expected of a high-class hotel or resort. Some hotels are also developed as a condo hotel, in which individual rooms are sold off to individual owners.

== International urban fractional ownership ==
International real-estate fractional ownership extends the traditional vacation-home model into urban markets, including deeded interests in properties held through legal frameworks such as non-profit homeowner associations or limited liability companies. In France — particularly Paris — firms like Paris Perfect and Fractional France offer fractional ownership of apartments (for example, one-eighth or one-thirteenth interests), structured via formal legal entities rather than timeshare contracts.

== Other areas ==
Fractional ownership is also beginning to appear for luxury items such as small yachts and megayachts, jet aircraft (especially business jets) and high-end motor homes.

Fractional yacht / boat ownership provides marine enthusiasts with ownership of shares in yachts of all sizes and uses. Some programs sell actual equity in the watercraft and others sell "membership," where the members' dues provide access to the boats, but no ownership. Fractional yacht companies sell shares/membership in small motor boats, sailboats, mid-range yachts all the way to the megayachts for day-use, multi-year contracts, or charter-like arrangements.

== See also ==
- Destination club
- Fractional financing
- Fractional renting
- Group buying
- Timeshare
