= National Children's Cancer Society =

U.S. nonprofit organization

The National Children's Cancer Society (NCCS) is an American charity based in Belleville, IL, which provides emotional, financial and educational support to children with cancer, their families, and survivors.

== Mission ==
The National Children’s Cancer Society (NCCS) provides vital and unique services for children with cancer, their families, and survivors. Our comprehensive programs support children and their families at every stage of their journey, addressing immediate and long-term needs, from diagnosis and treatment to survivorship and beyond.

How we support children with cancer, their families, and survivors:

- Transportation Assistance Fund: Provides financial support to families so their child has consistent access to care, covering travel expenses to help ease the burden
- Emergency Assistance Fund: A special fund available to families whose child has been inpatient or relocated for an extended period of time, it offers help with essential daily needs, including mortgage payments, prescriptions, car repairs, copays, and more
- Family Support Program: Connects families with highly trained case managers who provide one-on-one emotional support, advocacy tips, and personalized guidance throughout their journey
- Beyond the Cure Program: Empowers childhood cancer survivors with educational resources, a Late Effects After Treatment Tool, long-term care referrals, and a scholarship fund to help them achieve their academic goals
- Global Outreach Program: Partners with pharmaceutical companies in the United States to distribute lifesaving medications to hospitals in developing countries, giving children worldwide access to lifesaving treatment

== Vision ==
A world in which all children with cancer survive and thrive.

History

Christmas of 1986 was a time of both hope and heartbreak for Mark and Carol Stolze. They were visiting a friend in the hospital battling stage 4 Hodgkin’s lymphoma. Despite undergoing numerous treatments, her cancer had not diminished, and she faced a grim prognosis: without a bone marrow transplant, her chances of survival were slim. As she cried, she revealed her fears not only about her own fate but also the financial burden her family, already struggling in their rural home, would face. The transplant was prohibitively expensive, and with only 12 hospitals in the U.S. equipped for the procedure and insurance companies reluctant to cover it, her situation seemed nearly hopeless.

Moved by their friend’s plight, Mark and Carol were determined to help but felt overwhelmed by the lack of resources. The head of the transplant unit explained the dire situation: while the procedure was potentially lifesaving, without financial means, the hospital could only offer palliative care. Mark was shocked to learn that, in the previous year alone, around 30 children had been turned away due to financial barriers despite their critical need for treatment.

With a background in the jewelry business, Mark was initially unfamiliar with the challenges faced by families dealing with childhood cancer. However, as he immersed himself in understanding these hardships, he felt compelled to act. Six months later, with his wife, Carol, and his father, Alvin, The National Children’s Cancer Society was founded. He knew the organization’s success hinged on raising significant funds. Partnering with a telemarketing agent, the NCCS quickly made an impact, covering the cost of eight to 12 bone marrow transplants in its first year.

Mark soon discovered that insurance companies also refused to cover the cost of harvesting bone marrow, a crucial part of the transplant process. The NCCS began funding bone marrow donor searches and harvesting procedures to address this. As advancements in healthcare made bone marrow transplants a standard treatment for many cancers, insurance companies began covering these procedures. The NCCS adapted by focusing on other unmet needs families faced, such as transportation, lodging, and meals—expenses that often created significant barriers to receiving consistent treatment.

In the sixth year of its operation, the NCCS received an unexpected and unique offer from a pharmaceutical company to donate excess chemotherapy drugs. At the same time, a Russian oncology facility requested chemotherapy donations for its young patients. These events highlighted the severe shortage of medical resources in impoverished countries, leading to the creation of the Global Outreach Program—the first pharmaceutical drug donation program specifically focused on pediatric cancer.

Michele Hertlein led the Global Outreach Program for 24 years, demonstrating unwavering dedication before her own battle with cancer. Her personal experience with the disease deepened her understanding of the critical need for accessible cancer care, particularly for children. Through her leadership, she identified and addressed the urgent needs of hospitals in low- and middle-income countries, significantly impacting and saving countless lives.

Over the years, the NCCS recognized that combating childhood cancer required more than financial support. Emotional support became a crucial aspect of their services. The organization’s case managers offer compassionate, individualized support, helping families navigate their unique challenges and providing tailored referrals and resources.

Entering remission is exciting, but the journey is far from over. To support survivors, the NCCS established the Beyond the Cure program, which provides resources and tools for living healthier post-treatment. This includes the Late Effects After Treatment Tool (LEATT) and the Beyond the Cure Ambassador Scholarship Program, helping survivors thrive long after their initial battle with cancer.

From diagnosis and treatment to survivorship and beyond, the NCCS continues to be a reliable source of support in an uncertain world, dedicated to walking alongside families every step of the way.
