= List of Texas Longhorns in the NFL draft =

College football players selected in NFL draft

This is a list of Texas Longhorns football players in the NFL draft.

== Key ==
†	= Pro Bowler
‡	= Elected to the Pro Football Hall of Fame
^	= Super Bowl/NFL Champion

B	Back	K	Kicker	NT	Nose tackle
C	Center	LB	Linebacker	FB	Fullback
DB	Defensive back	P	Punter	HB	Halfback
DE	Defensive end	QB	Quarterback	WR	Wide receiver
DT	Defensive tackle	RB	Running back	G	Guard
E	End	T	Offensive tackle	TE	Tight end

== Selections ==
Year	Round	Pick	Overall	Name	Team	Position
1938	3	4	19	Hugh Wolfe†^	Pittsburgh Steelers	FB
1939	22	5	200	Jack Rhodes	New York Giants	G
1940	5	5	35	Park Myers	Cleveland Rams	T
1941	8	9	69	Glenn Jackson	Brooklyn Dodgers	C
1941	10	1	81	Don Williams	Philadelphia Eagles	T
1942	1	6	6	Spec Sanders†	Washington Redskins	RB
1942	2	1	11	Vernon Martin	Pittsburgh Steelers	QB
1942	4	1	26	Malcolm Kutner^	Pittsburgh Steelers	E
1942	6	2	42	Mike Sweeney	Cleveland Rams	E
1942	6	4	44	Chal Daniel	Chicago Cardinals	G
1942	8	7	67	Preston Flanagan	Brooklyn Dodgers	E
1942	11	3	93	Noble Doss^	Philadelphia Eagles	RB
1942	14	8	128	Pete Layden	New York Giants	B
1942	15	8	138	Buddy Jungmichel	New York Giants	G
1942	17	4	154	Jackie Crain	Chicago Cardinals	B
1943	5	8	38	Roy McKay^	Green Bay Packers	B
1943	7	3	53	Stan Mauldin^	Chicago Cardinals	T
1943	10	2	82	Bill Conoly	Philadelphia Eagles	T
1943	18	7	167	Jackie Field	Pittsburgh Steelers	B
1943	25	2	232	Joe Schwarting	Philadelphia Eagles	E
1943	27	7	257	Jack Freeman	Pittsburgh Steelers	G
1943	29	2	272	Wally Scott	Philadelphia Eagles	E
1943	29	9	279	Lou Wayne	Chicago Bears	E
1943	30	7	287	Fritz Lobpries	Pittsburgh Steelers	G
1944	2	2	13	Jim Callahan	Brooklyn Dodgers	B
1944	3	2	18	Ralph Park	Brooklyn Dodgers	B
1944	5	4	36	Joe Parker^	Philadelphia Eagles	E
1944	7	7	61	Hal Fischer	Washington Redskins	G
1944	8	2	67	Jack Sachse	Brooklyn Dodgers	C
1944	16	5	158	Ralph Ellsworth	New York Giants	RB
1944	17	1	165	Joe Magliolo	Chicago Cardinals	B
1944	18	5	180	Marcel Gres	New York Giants	T
1944	21	1	209	Jack West	Chicago Cardinals	E
1944	23	2	232	Bucky Gillenwater	Brooklyn Dodgers	T
1944	28	11	296	Aubrey Gill	Boston Yanks	C
1944	32	6	330	Walton Roberts	Boston Yanks	B
1945	13	6	126	Ralph Ellsworth	Chicago Bears	RB
1945	19	10	196	Glenn Morries	New York Giants	T
1945	27	2	276	Don Fambrough	Chicago Cardinals	B
1945	27	7	281	Ray Jones	Chicago Bears	B
1946	7	5	55	Jim Plyler	New York Giants	T
1947	1	5	5	Hub Bechtol	Pittsburgh Steelers	E
1947	2	2	13	Walter Heap	Boston Yanks	B
1947	5	10	35	Jim Canady	Chicago Bears	B
1947	6	10	45	Harlan Wetz	Chicago Bears	T
1947	8	4	59	Hank Harris	Washington Redskins	G
1947	19	9	174	Frank Guess	New York Giants	B
1947	20	9	184	Tom Landry‡†^	New York Giants	DB
1947	20	10	184	Bill Cromer	Chicago Bears	B
1947	23	10	215	Allen Lawler	Chicago Bears	B
1947	24	2	217	Ed Heap	Boston Yanks	T
1947	28	10	265	Joe Bill Baumgardner	Chicago Bears	B
1948	1	3	3	Bobby Layne‡†^	Chicago Bears	QB
1948	1	10	10	Max Bumgardner	Chicago Bears	DB
1948	3	9	22	Paul Campbell	Philadelphia Eagles	QB
1948	15	10	135	George Petrovich	Chicago Cardinals	T
1948	16	6	141	Travis Raven	Green Bay Packers	B
1948	17	6	151	Dale Schwartzkopf	Washington Redskins	E
1948	19	6	171	Charley Tatom	Green Bay Packers	T
1948	21	5	190	Ray Borneman	Los Angeles Rams	B
1948	21	9	194	Peppy Blount	Chicago Bears	E
1948	22	3	198	Joel Williams	Washington Redskins	C
1948	30	1	276	Ed Kelley	New York Giants	T
1949	1	11	11	Dick Harris	Chicago Bears	C
1949	10	7	98	Vic Vasicek	Washington Redskins	G
1950	3	6	33	Randy Clay	New York Giants	B
1950	4	11	51	Ben Proctor	Los Angeles Rams	E
1950	8	1	93	Dick Harris	Baltimore Colts	C
1950	10	1	119	Errol Fry	Baltimore Colts	G
1950	13	1	158	Ray Stone	Baltimore Colts	E
1950	25	9	322	Perry Samuels	Chicago Bears	B
1950	26	4	330	Bobby Coy Lee	Detroit Lions	B
1950	28	12	364	Billy Pyle	Cleveland Browns	B
1951	1	11	11	Bud McFadin†	Los Angeles Rams	G
1951	2	8	22	Ken Jackson	New York Yanks	T
1951	7	11	85	Joel Williams	New York Giants	C
1951	15	11	182	Gene Vykukal	New York Giants	T
1951	17	8	203	Dick Rowan	New York Yanks	C
1951	21	12	255	Ray Stone	Cleveland Browns	E
1951	25	6	297	Dick Harris	Detroit Lions	C
1952	3	3	28	Bobby Dillon‡†	Green Bay Packers	DB
1952	4	10	47	Don Menasco	New York Giants	DB
1952	9	1	98	Jim Lansford	New York Yanks	T
1952	9	12	109	Byron Townsend	Los Angeles Rams	B
1952	12	2	135	Bill Wilson	Green Bay Packers	T
1952	12	10	143	Dick Ochoa	New York Giants	B
1952	14	1	153	Paul Williams	New York Yanks	E
1952	14	5	162	June Davis	Pittsburgh Steelers	G
1952	20	1	230	John Adams	New York Yanks	E
1952	22	10	263	Bob Raley	New York Giants	B
1952	30	10	359	Joe Arnold	New York Giants	G
1953	1	10	10	Tom Stolhandske	San Francisco 49ers	LB
1953	1	13	13	Harley Sewell†^	Detroit Lions	G
1953	4	6	43	Gib Dawson	Green Bay Packers	RB
1953	8	10	95	Carlton Massey†	Cleveland Browns	DE
1953	15	7	176	Charley Genthner	San Francisco 49ers	T
1953	17	6	199	Bill Georges	Green Bay Packers	E
1954	9	8	105	Phil Branch	Philadelphia Eagles	G
1954	13	5	150	Julius Seaholm	Chicago Bears	G
1954	16	7	188	Gilmer Spring	Washington Redskins	E
1955	2	9	22	Buck Lansford†	Philadelphia Eagles	T
1955	5	6	55	Edward Kelley	Los Angeles Rams	DB
1955	6	9	70	Billy Quinn	Philadelphia Eagles	B
1955	13	6	151	Dave Parkinson	Los Angeles Rams	B
1955	15	2	171	Gerry Petersen	Baltimore Colts	T
1955	20	8	237	Glen Dyer	San Francisco 49ers	B
1956	1	10	10	Menan Schriewer	Chicago Bears	E
1956	5	6	55	Herb Gray	Baltimore Colts	DE
1956	19	5	222	Delano Womack	Philadelphia Eagles	B
1956	24	9	286	Johnny Tatum	Washington Redskins	C
1957	15	1	170	Mort Moriarty	Philadelphia Eagles	E
1958	20	9	238	Joe Clements	New York Giants	B
1958	30	5	354	Walter Fondren	Los Angeles Rams	B
1959	28	4	328	Vince Matthews	Detroit Lions	B
1959	29	9	345	Eddie Southern	Chicago Bears	E
1960	2	6	18	Larry Stephens	Cleveland Browns	DT
1960	8	8	92	Monte Lee	Philadelphia Eagles	E
1960	15	11	179	Mike Dowdle	San Francisco 49ers	B
1961	8	2	100	Don Talbert^	Dallas Cowboys	T
1962	7	5	89	Jack Collins	Pittsburgh Steelers	RB
1962	11	6	146	Jimmy Saxton	St. Louis Cardinals	RB
1962	11	3	172	Bob Moses	Dallas Cowboys	E
1963	3	3	31	Ray Poage	Minnesota Vikings	TE
1963	6	5	75	Jerry Cook	Baltimore Colts	B
1963	14	9	191	Stanley Faulkner	Cleveland Browns	T
1963	20	6	272	Tommy Lucas	Dallas Cowboys	E
1964	1	4	4	Scott Appleton	Dallas Cowboys	DT
1964	5	4	60	Duke Carlisle	Green Bay Packers	QB
1964	12	5	159	Sandy Sands	Minnesota Vikings	E
1965	11	1	141	Ernie Koy Jr.†	New York Giants	RB
1965	14	1	183	Olen Underwood	New York Giants	E
1966	1	1	1	Tommy Nobis†	Atlanta Falcons	LB
1966	5	2	66	Diron Talbert	Los Angeles Rams	DT
1966	7	9	104	Phil Harris	New York Giants	RB
1966	14	13	213	Pete Lammons^	Cleveland Browns	TE
1967	7	12	171	John Elliott†^	New York Jets	DT
1967	7	14	173	David Conway	San Diego Chargers	K
1967	8	11	196	Gene Bledsoe	New York Jets	G
1968	6	1	139	Howard Fest	Cincinnati Bengals	T
1968	15	17	398	Ronnie Ehrig	New York Jets	DB
1969	3	17	69	Bill Bradley†	Philadelphia Eagles	DB
1969	5	26	130	Chris Gilbert	New York Jets	FB
1969	14	15	353	Ron Ehrig	Chicago Bears	DB
1969	16	15	405	Lloyd Wainscott	Houston Oilers	DT
1970	1	21	21	Bob McKay	Cleveland Browns	T
1970	2	5	31	Leo Brooks†	Houston Oilers	DT
1970	2	24	50	Ted Koy	Oakland Raiders	TE
1971	2	12	38	Cotton Speyrer	Washington Redskins	WR
1971	2	26	52	Bill Atessis	Baltimore Colts	DE
1971	4	5	83	Happy Feller	Philadelphia Eagles	K
1971	4	6	84	Bill Zapalac	New York Jets	LB
1971	4	12	90	Steve Worster	Los Angeles Rams	FB
1971	7	6	162	Scott Palmer	New York Jets	DT
1971	12	8	294	Bobby Wuensch	Baltimore Colts	T
1971	13	5	317	Danny Lester	Philadelphia Eagles	DB
1971	14	7	345	Daryl Comer	Atlanta Falcons	TE
1972	2	4	30	Jim Bertelsen†	Los Angeles Rams	RB
1972	4	17	95	Eddie Phillips	Los Angeles Rams	QB
1973	1	3	3	Jerry Sisemore†	Philadelphia Eagles	T
1973	6	14	144	Travis Roach	New York Jets	G
1973	13	4	316	Alan Lowry^	New England Patriots	DB
1973	17	1	417	Randy Braband	Houston Oilers	LB
1974	6	5	135	Bill Wyman	New York Jets	C
1974	10	10	244	Glen Gaspard	San Francisco 49ers	LB
1975	2	12	38	Doug English†	Detroit Lions	DT
1975	5	1	105	Roosevelt Leaks	Baltimore Colts	RB
1975	11	4	264	Mike Dean	Chicago Bears	K
1976	3	17	77	Bob Simmons	New Orleans Saints	T
1976	11	24	315	Marty Akins	St. Louis Cardinals	DB
1976	13	18	365	Will Wilcox	Buffalo Bills	G
1976	14	13	388	Rick Thurman	Kansas City Chiefs	T
1977	1	16	16	Raymond Clayborn†	New England Patriots	DB
1977	5	19	131	Ernest Lee	St. Louis Cardinals	DT
1977	6	11	150	Rick Burleson	Kansas City Chiefs	DE
1977	12	21	328	Rick Fenlaw	St. Louis Cardinals	LB
1978	1	1	1	Earl Campbell‡†	Houston Oilers	RB
1978	3	18	74	Brad Shearer	Chicago Bears	DT
1978	7	1	167	Alfred Jackson	Atlanta Falcons	WR
1978	9	23	245	Dave Studdard	Baltimore Colts	T
1979	1	11	11	Russell Erxleben	New Orleans Saints	K
1979	8	23	215	Glen Blackwood	Miami Dolphins	DB
1980	1	2	2	Lam Jones	New York Jets	WR
1980	1	17	17	Johnnie Johnson	Los Angeles Rams	DB
1980	1	24	24	Derrick Hatchett	Baltimore Colts	DB
1980	3	17	73	Steve McMichael‡†^	New England Patriots	DT
1980	4	1	84	Ricky Churchman^	San Francisco 49ers	DB
1980	6	4	142	Bill Acker	St. Louis Cardinals	DT
1980	12	1	306	Charles Vaclavik	Pittsburgh Steelers	DB
1981	2	17	45	Robin Sendlein	Minnesota Vikings	LB
1981	10	6	254	Ken McCune	Tampa Bay Buccaneers	DE
1981	10	14	262	Les Studdard	Kansas City Chiefs	G
1982	1	1	1	Kenneth Sims	New England Patriots	DE
1982	2	6	33	Bruce Scholtz	Seattle Seahawks	LB
1982	2	12	39	Terry Tausch^	Minnesota Vikings	G
1982	2	20	47	Lawrence Sampleton	Philadelphia Eagles	TE
1982	4	27	110	Rodney Tate	Cincinnati Bengals	RB
1982	5	4	115	Mike Baab	Cleveland Browns	C
1982	5	8	119	Vance Bedford	St. Louis Cardinals	DB
1982	5	16	127	William Graham	Detroit Lions	DB
1982	7	14	181	Joe Shearin	Los Angeles Rams	G
1982	8	7	202	A. J. Jones	Los Angeles Rams	RB
1982	8	14	209	John Goodson	Pittsburgh Steelers	P
1982	9	7	230	Mike Hatchett	Chicago Bears	DB
1983	6	12	152	Kiki DeAyala	Cincinnati Bengals	LB
1983	7	2	170	Herkie Walls	Houston Oilers	WR
1984	1	6	6	Mossy Cade	San Diego Chargers	DB
1984	2	15	43	Ed Williams	New England Patriots	LB
1984	2	17	45	Doug Dawson	St. Louis Cardinals	G
1984	3	1	57	Fred Acorn	Tampa Bay Buccaneers	DB
1984	3	24	80	Rick McIvor	St. Louis Cardinals	QB
1984	4	9	93	Craig Curry	Indianapolis Colts	DB
1984	5	5	117	Eric Holle	Kansas City Chiefs	DE
1984	5	11	123	Jitter Fields	New Orleans Saints	DB
1984	5	17	129	Jeff Leiding	St. Louis Cardinals	LB
1984	7	13	181	John Haines	Minnesota Vikings	DT
1984	8	3	199	Ray Woodard	San Diego Chargers	DT
1984	8	18	214	David Jones^	Detroit Lions	C
1984	9	17	241	John Walker	St. Louis Cardinals	RB
1984	9	19	243	Adam Schreiber	Seattle Seahawks	G
1984	10	20	272	Bobby Micho	Denver Broncos	TE
1984	10	24	276	Kirk McJunkin	Pittsburgh Steelers	T
1984	12	6	314	Mark Lang	Kansas City Chiefs	LB
1984u	1	17	17	Mike Ruether	St. Louis Cardinals	C
1985	1	21	21	Jerry Gray†	Los Angeles Rams	DB
1985	5	15	127	Tony Degrate	Cincinnati Bengals	DE
1985	9	6	230	June James	Detroit Lions	LB
1985	10	11	263	Terry Orr^	Washington Redskins	TE
1986	3	4	59	Gene Chilton	St. Louis Cardinals	C
1986	4	13	95	Ty Allert	San Diego Chargers	LB
1986	8	24	218	John Stuart	Miami Dolphins	T
1986	9	28	249	John Teltschik	Chicago Bears	P
1986	10	20	269	Bryan Chester	Dallas Cowboys	G
1986	12	2	307	Chris Duliban	Dallas Cowboys	LB
1987	5	12	124	Everett Gay	Dallas Cowboys	WR
1987	6	25	165	Stephen Braggs	Cleveland Browns	DB
1987	11	12	291	Jeff Ward	Dallas Cowboys	K
1987	11	25	304	Laron Brown	Washington Redskins	WR
1987	12	26	333	Eric Jeffries	Chicago Bears	DB
1988	6	4	141	Paul Jetton	Cincinnati Bengals	G
1988	8	11	204	John Hagy	Buffalo Bills	DB
1989	1	13	13	Eric Metcalf†	Cleveland Browns	RB
1989	3	25	81	Britt Hager	Philadelphia Eagles	LB
1989	9	17	240	Darron Norris	New England Patriots	RB
1990	5	18	127	Ken Hackemack	Kansas City Chiefs	T
1990	6	16	153	Tony Jones	Houston Oilers	WR
1991	1	9	9	Stanley Richard	San Diego Chargers	DB
1991	1	22	22	Stan Thomas	Chicago Bears	T
1991	5	14	125	Kerry Cash	Indianapolis Colts	WR
1991	7	21	188	Keith Cash	Washington Redskins	TE
1991	8	8	203	Johnny Walker	Green Bay Packers	WR
1991	8	18	213	Brian Jones	Los Angeles Raiders	LB
1991	12	11	317	Chris Samuels	San Diego Chargers	RB
1991	12	27	333	Stephen Clark	Buffalo Bills	TE
1992	2	26	54	Shane Dronett	Denver Broncos	DE
1992	2	27	55	James Patton	Buffalo Bills	DT
1992	3	19	75	Tommy Jeter	Philadelphia Eagles	DT
1992	4	26	110	Chuck Johnson	Denver Broncos	G
1992	6	21	161	Mark Berry	Chicago Bears	DB
1992	9	28	252	Boone Powell	Washington Redskins	LB
1992	12	5	313	Lance Wilson	Phoenix Cardinals	DT
1993	7	7	175	Lance Gunn	Cincinnati Bengals	DB
1994	2	28	57	Van Malone	Detroit Lions	DB
1994	3	14	79	Winfred Tubbs†	New Orleans Saints	LB
1995	1	29	29	Blake Brockermeyer	Carolina Panthers	T
1995	4	17	115	Lovell Pinkney	St. Louis Rams	TE
1996	2	3	33	Tony Brackens†	Jacksonville Jaguars	DE
1996	5	7	139	John Elmore	New England Patriots	G
1997	1	5	5	Bryant Westbrook	Detroit Lions	DB
1997	3	7	67	Dan Neil^	Denver Broncos	G
1997	3	29	89	Chris Carter	New England Patriots	DB
1997	5	28	158	Taje Allen^	St. Louis Rams	DB
1997	7	22	223	Mike Adams	Pittsburgh Steelers	WR
1997	7	25	226	Pat Fitzgerald	Buffalo Bills	TE
1998	7	31	220	Chris Akins	Philadelphia Eagles	DT
1999	1	5	5	Ricky Williams†	New Orleans Saints	RB
1999	4	23	118	Wane McGarity	Dallas Cowboys	WR
1999	4	30	125	Jay Humphrey	Minnesota Vikings	T
2000	6	25	191	Cedric Woodard	Baltimore Ravens	DT
2001	1	2	2	Leonard Davis†	Arizona Cardinals	T
2001	1	19	19	Casey Hampton†^	Pittsburgh Steelers	DT
2001	2	30	61	Shaun Rogers†	Detroit Lions	DT
2002	1	4	4	Mike Williams	Buffalo Bills	T
2002	1	5	5	Quentin Jammer	San Diego Chargers	DB
2003	3	2	66	Cory Redding	Detroit Lions	DE
2003	3	17	81	Derrick Dockery	Washington Redskins	G
2003	3	33	97	Chris Simms	Tampa Bay Buccaneers	QB
2003	4	26	123	Rod Babers	New York Giants	DB
2004	1	7	7	Roy Williams†	Detroit Lions	WR
2004	1	23	23	Marcus Tubbs	Seattle Seahawks	DT
2004	4	14	110	Nathan Vasher†	Chicago Bears	DB
2004	7	10	211	Sloan Thomas	Houston Texans	WR
2005	1	4	4	Cedric Benson	Chicago Bears	RB
2005	1	15	15	Derrick Johnson†	Kansas City Chiefs	LB
2005	6	5	179	Bo Scaife	Houston Texans	TE
2006	1	3	3	Vince Young†	Tennessee Titans	QB
2006	1	7	7	Michael Huff	Oakland Raiders	DB
2006	2	16	48	Cedric Griffin	Minnesota Vikings	DB
2006	3	22	86	David Thomas^	New England Patriots	TE
2006	5	8	141	Jonathan Scott	Detroit Lions	T
2006	7	18	226	Rodrique Wright	Miami Dolphins	DE
2007	1	19	19	Michael Griffin†	Tennessee Titans	DB
2007	1	20	20	Aaron Ross^	New York Giants	DB
2007	2	7	39	Justin Blalock	Atlanta Falcons	T
2007	2	24	56	Tim Crowder	Denver Broncos	DE
2007	4	3	102	Brian Robison	Minnesota Vikings	DE
2007	5	10	147	Tarell Brown	San Francisco 49ers	DB
2007	6	9	183	Kasey Studdard	Houston Texans	G
2008	2	22	53	Limas Sweed^	Pittsburgh Steelers	WR
2008	3	10	73	Jamaal Charles†	Kansas City Chiefs	RB
2008	3	28	91	Jermichael Finley^	Green Bay Packers	TE
2008	4	31	130	Tony Hills^	Pittsburgh Steelers	T
2008	5	16	151	Frank Okam	Houston Texans	DT
2009	1	13	13	Brian Orakpo†	Washington Redskins	LB
2009	3	17	81	Roy Miller	Tampa Bay Buccaneers	DT
2009	4	5	105	Henry Melton†	Chicago Bears	DT
2009	7	2	211	Chris Ogbonnaya	St. Louis Rams	RB
2010	1	14	14	Earl Thomas†^	Seattle Seahawks	DB
2010	2	11	43	Sergio Kindle^	Baltimore Ravens	LB
2010	2	12	44	Lamarr Houston	Oakland Raiders	LB
2010	3	20	84	Jordan Shipley	Cincinnati Bengals	WR
2010	3	21	85	Colt McCoy	Cleveland Browns	QB
2010	4	33	131	Roddrick Muckelroy	Cincinnati Bengals	LB
2011	2	2	34	Aaron Williams	Buffalo Bills	DB
2011	3	31	95	Curtis Brown	Pittsburgh Steelers	DB
2011	4	6	103	Sam Acho	Arizona Cardinals	LB
2011	5	33	164	Chykie Brown^	Baltimore Ravens	DB
2012	4	24	119	Keenan Robinson	Washington Redskins	LB
2012	6	34	204	Emmanuel Acho	Cleveland Browns	LB
2012	7	8	215	Kheeston Randall	Miami Dolphins	DT
2013	1	15	15	Kenny Vaccaro	New Orleans Saints	DB
2013	3	16	78	Marquise Goodwin	Buffalo Bills	WR
2013	4	6	103	Alex Okafor^	Arizona Cardinals	LB
2015	1	32	32	Malcom Brown^	New England Patriots	DT
2015	3	20	84	Jordan Hicks^	Philadelphia Eagles	LB
2015	5	8	144	Mykkele Thompson	New York Giants	DB
2015	6	24	200	Quandre Diggs†^	Detroit Lions	DB
2015	7	29	246	Geoff Swaim	Dallas Cowboys	TE
2016	4	18	116	Hassan Ridgeway	Indianapolis Colts	DT
2017	3	25	88	D'Onta Foreman	Houston Texans	RB
2018	2	18	50	Connor Williams	Dallas Cowboys	T
2018	3	13	78	Malik Jefferson	Cincinnati Bengals	LB
2018	5	12	149	Michael Dickson†^	Seattle Seahawks	P
2018	6	16	190	DeShon Elliott	Baltimore Ravens	DB
2019	5	23	161	Charles Omenihu^	Houston Texans	DE
2019	7	3	217	Kris Boyd	Minnesota Vikings	DB
2020	3	6	70	Brandon Jones	Miami Dolphins	DB
2020	3	28	92	Devin Duvernay†	Baltimore Ravens	WR
2020	5	19	165	Collin Johnson	Jacksonville Jaguars	WR
2021	2	19	51	Sam Cosmi	Washington Football Team	T
2021	3	5	69	Joseph Ossai	Cincinnati Bengals	DE
2021	5	4	148	Ta'Quon Graham	Atlanta Falcons	DE
2021	5	8	152	Caden Sterns	Denver Broncos	DB
2021	6	34	218	Sam Ehlinger	Indianapolis Colts	QB
2023	1	8	8	Bijan Robinson†	Atlanta Falcons	RB
2023	3	27	90	DeMarvion Overshown	Dallas Cowboys	LB
2023	4	13	115	Roschon Johnson	Chicago Bears	RB
2023	6	17	194	Keondre Coburn	Kansas City Chiefs	DT
2023	7	32	249	Moro Ojomo^	Philadelphia Eagles	DE
2024	1	16	16	Byron Murphy II^	Seattle Seahawks	DT
2024	1	28	28	Xavier Worthy	Kansas City Chiefs	WR
2024	2	6	38	T'Vondre Sweat	Tennessee Titans	DT
2024	2	14	46	Jonathon Brooks	Carolina Panthers	RB
2024	2	20	52	Adonai Mitchell	Indianapolis Colts	WR
2024	4	1	101	Ja'Tavion Sanders	Carolina Panthers	TE
2024	5	27	162	Christian Jones	Arizona Cardinals	T
2024	5	32	167	Keilan Robinson	Jacksonville Jaguars	RB
2024	5	40	175	Jaylan Ford	New Orleans Saints	LB
2024	6	19	195	Ryan Watts	Pittsburgh Steelers	DB
2024	6	37	213	Jordan Whittington	Los Angeles Rams	WR
2025	1	9	9	Kelvin Banks Jr.	New Orleans Saints	OT
2025	1	20	20	Jahdae Barron	Denver Broncos	DB
2025	1	23	23	Matthew Golden	Green Bay Packers	WR
2025	2	11	43	Alfred Collins	San Francisco 49ers	DT
2025	2	32	64	Andrew Mukuba	Philadelphia Eagles	S
2025	3	7	71	Vernon Broughton	New Orleans Saints	DT
2025	4	18	120	Gunnar Helm	Tennessee Titans	TE
2025	4	22	124	Barryn Sorrell	Green Bay Packers	DE
2025	5	12	149	Jaydon Blue	Dallas Cowboys	RB
2025	6	31	207	Cameron Williams	Philadelphia Eagles	T
2025	6	35	211	Hayden Conner	Arizona Cardinals	G
2025	7	15	231	Quinn Ewers	Miami Dolphins	QB
2026	2	28	60	Anthony Hill Jr.	Tennessee Titans	LB
2026	4	24	124	Malik Muhammad	Chicago Bears	CB
2026	4	30	130	Trey Moore	Miami Dolphins	LB
2026	5	18	158	Michael Taaffe	Miami Dolphins	S
2026	6	19	200	DJ Campbell	Miami Dolphins	OL
2026	7	5	221	Jack Endries	Cincinnati Bengals	TE

== Notable undrafted players ==
Note: No drafts held before 1920

Debut year	Player name	Position	Debut NFL/AFL team	Notes
1964	Tommy Wade	QB	Pittsburgh Steelers	—
1965	Jim Hudson	S	New York Jets	—
1969	Curt Knight	K	Washington Redskins	—
1983	Raúl Allegre	K	Dallas Cowboys	—
1987	Mike January	LB	Chicago Bears	—
1991	Alex Waits	P	Seattle Seahawks	—
1997	Priest Holmes	RB	Baltimore Ravens	—
1998	Phil Dawson	K	Oakland Raiders	—
2000	Kwame Cavil	WR	Buffalo Bills	—
2002	Ahmad Brooks	CB	Buffalo Bills	—
2002	D. D. Lewis	LB	Seattle Seahawks	—
2002	Marcus Wilkins	LB	Green Bay Packers	—
2004	Cullen Loeffler	LS	Minnesota Vikings	—
2006	Ahmard Hall	FB	Tennessee Titans	—
2007	Lyle Sendlein	C	Arizona Cardinals	—
2009	Quan Cosby	WR	Cincinnati Bengals	—
2012	Justin Tucker	K	Baltimore Ravens	—
2014	Trey Hopkins	G	Cincinnati Bengals	—
2014	Adrian Phillips	S	San Diego Chargers	—
2015	Malcolm Brown	RB	St. Louis Rams	—
2016	Nick Rose	K	Atlanta Falcons	—
2017	Tyrone Swoopes	TE	Seattle Seahawks	—
2018	Holton Hill	DB	Minnesota Vikings	—
2018	Poona Ford	DT	Seattle Seahawks	—
2019	Calvin Anderson	OT	New England Patriots	—
2019	Andrew Beck	FB	New York Jets	—
2019	Lil'Jordan Humphrey	WR	New Orleans Saints	—
2019	Gary Johnson Jr.	LB	Kansas City Chiefs	—
2019	P.J. Locke	S	Pittsburgh Steelers	—
2019	Patrick Vahe	G	Baltimore Ravens	—
2020	Malcolm Roach	DB	New Orleans Saints	—
2021	Tarik Black	WR	Indianapolis Colts	—
2021	Brennan Eagles	WR	Dallas Cowboys	—
2022	Cameron Dicker	K	Los Angeles Rams	—
2022	Brenden Schooler	S	New England Patriots	—
2022	Josh Thompson	CB	Jacksonville Jaguars	—
2023	Anthony Cook	S	Kansas City Chiefs	—
2023	D'Shawn Jamison	CB	San Francisco 49ers	—
2025	Silas Bolden	WR	Minnesota Vikings	—
2025	Isaiah Bond	WR	Cleveland Browns	—
2025	David Gbenda	LB	Tennessee Titans	—
2025	Jake Majors	C	Tampa Bay Buccaneers	—
2025	Bill Norton	DE	Los Angeles Rams	—
2026	Jack Bouwmeester	P	San Francisco 49ers	—
2026	Cole Brevard	DL	Kansas City Chiefs	—
2026	Ethan Burke	OLB	Baltimore Ravens	—
2026	Matthew Caldwell	QB	Los Angeles Rams	—
2026	Jaylon Guilbeau	CB	Carolina Panthers	—
2026	Travis Shaw	DL	Baltimore Ravens	—
2026	Mason Shipley	K	New Orleans Saints	—
