= Ralph Ellsworth =

Personal information
- Born: 28 January 1924 Ohio, U.S.
- Died: 18 January 1998 (aged 73) Lakeway, Texas, U.S.
- Years active: 1943-1947

Sport
- Sport: Football, Track and field
- Position: Halfback
- College team: Texas Longhorns, Navy

Ralph Irving Ellsworth Jr. (28 January 1924 - 18 January 1998) was a college football player and track athlete. He was an All-Conference back for the Texas Longhorns in 1943 and helped Texas to its first repeat conference championship and its first-ever bowl game in 1944. He transferred to the Naval Academy in 1944, but returned to Texas for the 1945 and 1946 seasons. He was drafted by the New York Giants, Chicago Bears, and Cleveland Browns, but never played professional football. He was also a standout in track who won a national championship at Navy in 1945 and at Texas won conference championships in two individual events, three relays, and as part of two relay teams.

== Early life ==
Ellsworth was born in Ohio in 1924 and orphaned at a young age. He accepted the invitation to live with Mr. and Mrs. Ernest Gross and their son, and he became a part of their family.

At Alamo Heights High School in San Antonio he was a Texas state football all-star and track athlete. He won the 1942 Texas state championship in the 440-yard dash and was part of the state championship mile relay team the same year.

== College football ==
In 1943, his first season of college football, Ellsworth was an unlikely football star who started out as a wingback before moving to the critical tailback position. In Texas' single-wing formation, the tailback was the main talent, field general and the player who usually received the snap. He came to Austin in 1942 as part of the Naval ROTC training program and skipped his freshman season to focus on track. In 1943 the Marines at Texas were all moved to Southwestern University including several key Longhorn players such as Ken Matthews. This left Texas shorthanded creating an opportunity for Ellsworth to come out for the team. A series of injuries allowed him to move from the bench to an offensive leadership role. First, back Joe Bill Baumgardner broke his ankle in fall training and Ellsworth was promoted to starting wingback to fill the gap. He played that position for the first three games of the season. When starting tailback Ralph Hall was injured against Arkansas, Coach Dana X. Bible, who was also dealing with injuries to other backs such as Billy Main and Bob Rados, called on Ellsworth to lead the offense.

That season, he led the team in rushing and was co-leader in interceptions on defense. In a game against Rice he rushed for 199 yards, setting a school record that would stand for 23 years, and threw for another 86. Texas posted a 7–1 regular season record that year, with five wins by 20 points or more and a victory over 16th-ranked Texas A&M. Only a loss to 11th-ranked Southwestern, stocked with former Texas players, kept them from going undefeated. They won the Southwest Conference, finished the season ranked 14th and were invited to their first-ever bowl game, the 1944 Cotton Bowl. There they faced off against Randolph Field in a game that finished with a 7–7 tie. After falling behind by a touchdown, Ellsworth threw the game-tying 35-yard touchdown pass to prevent the loss.

The following April, a few days after being drafted in the 16th round of the 1944 NFL draft by the New York Giants, Ellsworth decided to transfer to the Naval Academy the following autumn with three seasons of eligibility remaining. If he had stayed at Texas, he would have gotten his Naval commission in November 1944, but he chose to take the Academy appointment offered to him by Congressman Paul Kilday of San Antonio instead, as it would help him realise his dream of becoming a naval attaché in the diplomatic service. Previously he had expressed interest in attending West Point.

In 1944, Ellsworth had less playing time at Navy Midshipmen since he was only a freshman on a team loaded with talent, but he still managed to average about half a game per game. Navy was one of the country's best programs that year, rising to second in the rankings by the end of the season. Their final game was against top-ranked Army Black Knights football, only the third meeting between a first-ranked and second-ranked team and the first to serve as a de facto national championship game. Navy lost 23–7. Despite Ellsworth's diminished role in 1944, he was drafted again, this time in the 11th round of the 1945 NFL draft, 128th overall, by the Chicago Bears.

In October 1945, Ellsworth resigned from the Academy and returned to Texas, not because of a lack of playing time he said, but because of changes at the school and a desire to marry his fiancé. When he started at Navy, one could graduate in 3 years, but when World War II ended the school returned to a 4-year standard. In addition he was told that he might not get a commission due to water on his knee which didn't impact his football or track performance. An honor student, his grades were never an issue.

He finished the 1945 season with two memorable plays. Against Texas A&M he ran for an 81-yard touchdown, which was the second longest in school history at the time; and then in the 1946 Cotton Bowl, he threw a 50-yard touchdown pass to Bobby Layne, having scored touchdowns by running, passing and catching in the same game. He also pitched a ball to Layne for a touchdown. Ellsworth had a good game himself as he was the Longhorns' leading rusher that day with 82 yards.

In 1946, Ellsworth would again find himself playing for a national contender as the Longhorns started the season ranked #1, but two losses cost them any chance at a conference championship or bowl game. Ellsworth was injured early in the season, and missed several games, but still managed to be named third team all-conference. Following the season, Ellsworth was drafted for a third time, this time by the Cleveland Browns in the 9th round of 1947 AAFC Draft, but again he passed on pro football to return to Texas.

In 1947, Ellsworth had already played four years of football and had sought a waiver to play a fifth, since one season was at Navy. He participated in spring drills, was talked about in the media as a returning player and made the school's roster. However, it does not seem as though he appeared in any games.

=== Records ===
- UT - Rushing yards, game (199), surpassed by Chris Gilbert in 1966

== College track ==
In addition to football, Ellsworth was a college track star who won an NCAA Championship at Navy and conference championships in several sprint events at Texas. He also played baseball at Navy.

In 1943, he was the Southwest Conference Champion in the 220-yard dash with a time of 21.2 seconds and as part of the 440-yard relay team. The following year, he was the Southwest Conference Champion in the 100-yard dash with a time of 9.8 seconds and led the Longhorns to the overall Conference Championship by being the "high point man" at the Conference Championship track meet. At the 1944 Texas Relays, he won the 100-yard dash again with a time of 9.8 seconds and was named the event's Outstanding Athlete.

In 1945, he was at the Naval Academy, where he competed on the team that won Navy's only Track and Field National Championship. At the 1945 Heps Men's Outdoor Track & Field Championships he was part of the winning 4x100 team.

Prior to the 1946 track season he returned to the Southwest Conference and competed with the Longhorns as they again won the Southwest Conference Championship.

== Later life ==
Ellsworth received a bachelor's degree in petroleum engineering in 1948 and a master's degree in geology in 1949, both from Texas, and went into the oil business in Houston. He and his wife Jackie McKay, the Sweetheart of the University of Texas in 1943, had four daughters and retired to Lakeway, Texas, in 1984. He was inducted into the Texas Longhorns Hall of Honor in 1989. He died on 18 January 1998.
