= Joel Williams =

Joel Williams may refer to:

- Joel Williams (linebacker) (born 1956), American football player
- Joel Williams (offensive lineman) (1926–1997), American football player
- Joel Williams (tight end) (born 1965), American football player
- Joel Williams (Big Brother), housemate on Big Brother 16

== See also ==
- Joe Williams (disambiguation)
