= Joseph Williams =

Joseph Williams may refer to:

== Music ==
- Joey Williams, American member of gospel group The Blind Boys of Alabama
- Joseph Williams (composer) (1800–1834), English composer
- Joseph Williams (music publisher), London music publisher
- Joseph Williams (musician) (born 1960), rock singer with band Toto

== Politics ==
- Joe Williams (Cook Islands politician) (1934–2020)
- Joseph Williams (Connecticut politician) (1779–1865)
- Joseph R. Williams (1808–1861), Michigan politician and college president
- Joseph F. Williams (1809–1882), American politician from Ohio
- Joseph Lanier Williams (1810–1865), U.S. Representative from Tennessee
- Joseph H. Williams (1814–1896), governor of Maine
- Joseph T. Williams (1842–1910), American politician in Nevada
- Joseph Powell Williams (1840–1904), English Liberal and Liberal Unionist politician
- J. J. Williams Jr. (1905–1968), Virginia legislator and segregationalist

== Religion ==
- Joseph A. Williams (born 1974), Catholic auxiliary bishop of Saint Paul and Minneapolis
- Joseph W. Williams (1857–1934), Anglican bishop of St John's, South Africa

== Sports ==
- Joey Williams (1902–1978), English footballer
- Joseph Williams (athlete) (1897–?), British Olympic athlete
- Joseph Williams (Nevisian cricketer) (born 1989)
- Joseph Williams (English cricketer) (1892–1916)
- Joseph Williams (Barbadian cricketer) (born 1974)
- Joseph Williams (footballer) (1857–?), Welsh international footballer
- Joseph Williams (American football) (born 2006), American football player

== Other ==
- Joseph Williams (justice) (1801–1870), Chief Justice of the Iowa Supreme Court
- Joseph D. Williams (1818–?), Adjutant General of the State of Connecticut
- Joseph P. Williams (1915–2003), creator of the BankAmericard
- Joseph M. Williams (1933–2008), professor of English
- Joseph Williams (actor), English stage actor

== See also ==
- Joe Williams (disambiguation)
