= Joe Williams =

Joe Williams may refer to:

== Music ==
- Big Joe Williams (1903–1982), Delta blues singer
- Joe Williams (jazz singer) (1918–1999), American jazz singer

== Sports ==
=== Association football ===
- Joe Williams (footballer, born 1996), English footballer
- Joe Williams (Irish footballer) (1907–1987)

=== Gridiron football ===
- Jumpin' Joe Williams (1915–1997), American football back
- Joe Williams (guard) (1896–1949), American football guard for the Canton Bulldogs and the New York Giants
- Joe Williams (defensive end) (born 1942), American football defensive end in Canada
- Joe Williams (fullback) (1941–2015), American football player in Canada
- Joe Williams (linebacker) (born 1965), American football linebacker
- Joe Williams (running back, born 1947), American football running back
- Joe Williams (running back, born 1993), American football running back

=== Other sports ===
- Smokey Joe Williams (1886–1951), Negro leagues baseball pitcher
- Joe Williams (basketball) (c.1934–2022), American basketball coach at Jacksonville, Furman, and Florida State universities
- Joe Williams (wrestler) (born 1974), American amateur freestyle wrestler
- Joe Williams (rugby league) (born 1983), Australian rugby league player for the Bulldogs National Rugby League team
- Joe Williams (fighter) (born 1985), American mixed martial artist

== Other ==
- Joe Williams (trade unionist) (1871–1929), British trade union leader
- Joe Williams (Cook Islands politician) (1934–2020), medical doctor and Prime Minister of the Cook Islands
- Joe Williams (film critic) (1958–2015), critic for the St. Louis Post-Dispatch
- Joe Williams (judge) (born 1961), New Zealand jurist
- Joe Williams (game developer) (born 1965), software developer

== See also ==
- Jo Williams (born 1948), executive at MENCAP
- Jo Williams (speed skater) (born 1981), British speed skater
- Joel Williams (disambiguation)
- Joey Williams (1902–1978), English former footballer
- Joseph Williams (disambiguation)
