= Michael Dickson =

Australian-born American football player (born 1996)

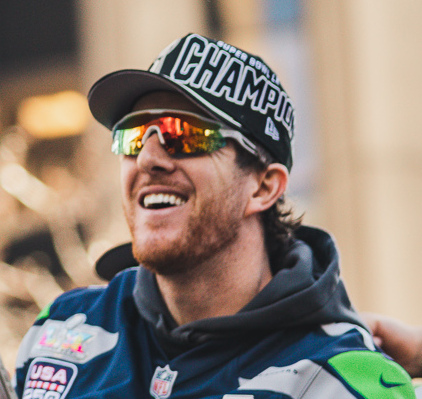
- Dickson with the Seattle Seahawks at the Super Bowl LX victory parade in 2026

No. 4 – Seattle Seahawks
- Positions: Punter, placekicker, holder
- Roster status: Active

Personal information
- Born: 4 January 1996 (age 30); Sydney, New South Wales, Australia
- Listed height: 6 ft 2 in (1.88 m)
- Listed weight: 208 lb (94 kg)

Career information
- High school: Kirrawee (Sydney)
- College: Texas (2015–2017)
- NFL draft: 2018: 5th round, 149th overall pick

Career history
- Seattle Seahawks (2018–present)

Awards and highlights
- Super Bowl champion (LX); First-team All-Pro (2018); Second-team All-Pro (2025); Pro Bowl (2018); PFWA All-Rookie Team (2018); Seattle Seahawks Top 50 players; Ray Guy Award (2017); Unanimous All-American (2017); Second-team All-American (2016); 2× Big 12 Special Teams Player of the Year (2016, 2017); 2017 Big 12 Football Scholar-Athlete of the Year; 2× First-team All-Big 12 (2016, 2017); 3x Academic All-Big 12 (2015, 2016, 2017); 2017 Texas Bowl MVP

Career NFL statistics as of Week 10, 2026
- Punts: 596
- Punting yards: 28,654
- Punting average: 48.1
- Longest punt: 73
- Inside 20: 248
- Stats at Pro Football Reference

Michael Dickson (born 4 January 1996) is an Australian professional American football punter, holder and occasional placekicker for the Seattle Seahawks of the National Football League (NFL). He played college football for the Texas Longhorns and was selected by the Seahawks in the fifth round of the 2018 NFL draft.

Dickson is a two-time All-Pro, former Pro Bowler and Ray Guy Award winner and won Super Bowl LX with the Seahawks. Regarded as one of the best punters of all time, his career punt average (48.1 yards per punt) is ranked at third in NFL history, only behind AJ Cole, and Jack Fox. He currently holds the NFL record for career postseason punt average (49.6 yard per punt).

== Early life ==
Born in Sydney, Dickson has Macedonian heritage through his mother's side. He mentions this on the official Seattle Seahawks Website 10) Macedonian food was popular in his family. "My family are Macedonian, so there were always some sort of Macedonian cuisine prepared for our big family dinners. There were a few staple recipes within our family that I really enjoyed."

He first played association football in his youth before switching to Australian rules football at the age of 9. In his first year of playing Australian rules football, he earned the Golden Boot award for kicking the most goals in a season. He excelled in Australian football while playing for the University of New South Wales-Eastern Suburbs Bulldogs in the local Sydney AFL competition and was subsequently placed in the Sydney Swans talent academy as a teenager. He continued to play for UNSW-ES and the Swans reserves in the North East Australian Football League in an attempt to be drafted to a professional AFL team but was overlooked at the 2014 AFL draft. Dickson's Australian football career highlight occurred when he was chosen to play for the Swans in the 2014 NEAFL Grand Final. The Swans were defeated by a two-point margin in the final.

In 2015, at the age of 19, he moved to Melbourne to trial with Prokick Australia, a coaching program designed to help aspiring kickers and punters cross the Pacific and crack American football. Through his Prokick Australia experience, he was picked up by the University of Texas as a punter by head coach Charlie Strong.

== College career ==
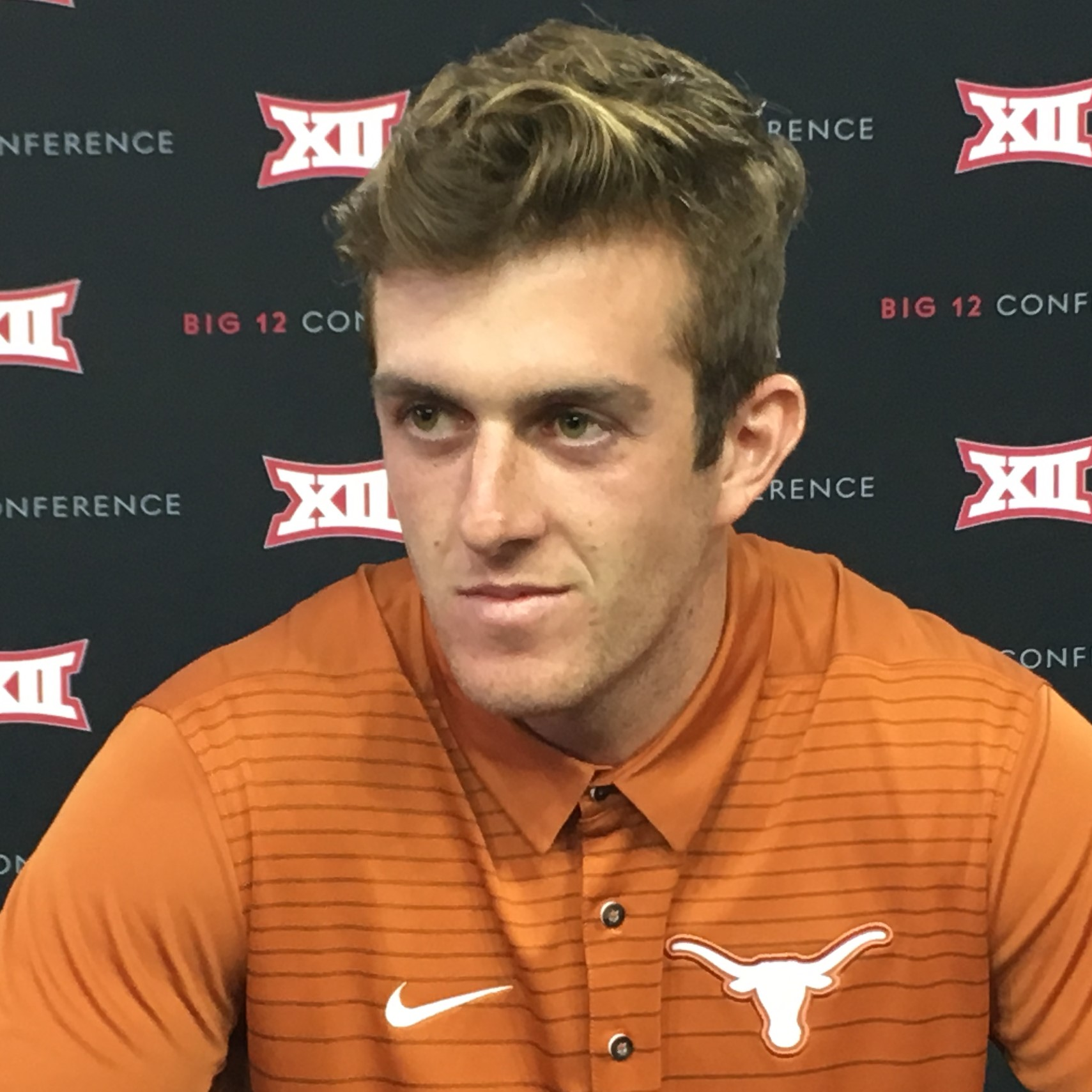
Dickson in 2017

In his first season with the Longhorns, Dickson had 77 punts for 3,179 net yards for a 41.3 average in 2015; earned Honorable Mention All-Big 12 honors and was named to the Academic All-Big 12 Rookie Team. Against Kansas State, he recovered a bad snap and was able to get the punt off anyway, pinning KSU at its 8-yard line and for this was awarded Big 12 Special Teams Player of the Week. Against Texas Tech, he averaged 51.0 ypp, the 6th highest single game average in school history. Despite his play, it was a tough season for Texas wherein the only highlights were upset victories over rivals #10 Oklahoma and #12 Baylor.

In the 2016 season, Dickson had 65 punts for 3,079 net yards for a 47.37 ypp average, a school record and the 3rd highest single-season average in Big 12 history. in the first game of the year, he set the school record for punting yards (330) and average ypp in a game (55.0) against Notre Dame. After the game against Texas Tech, in which he had a 51.0 yard average punt (8th highest in a game in school history), he was named Big 12 Special Teams player of the week for the 2nd time in his career. Against Baylor, he averaged 52.7 ypp, the 4th highest in school history at the time. In the TCU game, he kicked a then career-long 74 yard punt, the 6th longest in school history at the time. During the season he was named a Ray Guy Award finalist, the first in school history. At the end of the season he was a unanimous pick for the All-Big 12 team, named the Big 12 Special Teams player of the year, named to ESPN's All-Underclassman team and a 2nd (Sporting News, Football Writers Association of America and Phil Steele) and 3rd Team All-American (AP). The season was another down one for Texas, highlighted again by upset victories over #10 Notre Dame and #8 Baylor.

In 2017, Dickson had a school-record 84 punts for 3,984 net yards for a 47.43 average, which just barely topped his single-season school record for ypp from the year before. The 84 punts in season was also the 2nd most in Big 12 history. Against Iowa State, he kicked 7 punts with 4 of those for more than 50 yards and 2 for more than 60 yards and for his effort, he was named the Ray Guy punter of the week. He was again named Ray Guy Punter of the Week for his effort against Oklahoma, where he tied his own 55.0 ypp school record for punting average in a game. He had two other games that season, against Oklahoma State and Texas Tech where he averaged more than 50 yards per punt (50.9) which were tied for the 10th highest single-game punting average in school history at the time. Against TCU he kicked a career-long 76 yard punt, the 5th longest in school history and the 5th longest in the NCAA that year. He racked up numerous accolades on the year as he was named first team All-Big 12, Academic All-Big 12, the Big 12 Special Teams player of the year, the Big 12 Football Scholar-Athlete of the Year and a unanimous All-American. He also won the Ray Guy Award as the nation's best punter, the first Longhorn to do so. He was also named MVP of the 2017 Texas Bowl, the only punter in school history to be named MVP in a bowl game and only the 2nd punter to ever be named MVP in a major bowl game. Texas went 7-6 on the season and won the Texas Bowl, their first bowl game win since 2012.

In late December 2017, it was announced that Dickson would forgo his senior year at Texas in favor of the 2018 NFL draft.

He finished his career as the school's all-time leader in punting average (45.32 yards per punt), punts (226), and punting yards (10,242). His 45.32 yards per punt average was the 3rd highest average in Big 12 history at the time.

== Professional career ==
Pre-draft measurables
Height	Weight	Arm length	Hand span	Wingspan
6 ft 2 3/8 in (1.89 m)	208 lb (94 kg)	31 1/4 in (0.79 m)	9 1/4 in (0.23 m)	6 ft 2 1/8 in (1.88 m)
All values from NFL Combine

Dickson was selected by the Seattle Seahawks in the fifth round, 149th overall, of the 2018 NFL draft. Dickson would go on to win the punting job, after the Seahawks released longtime veteran Jon Ryan during the preseason, and also took over as placeholder.

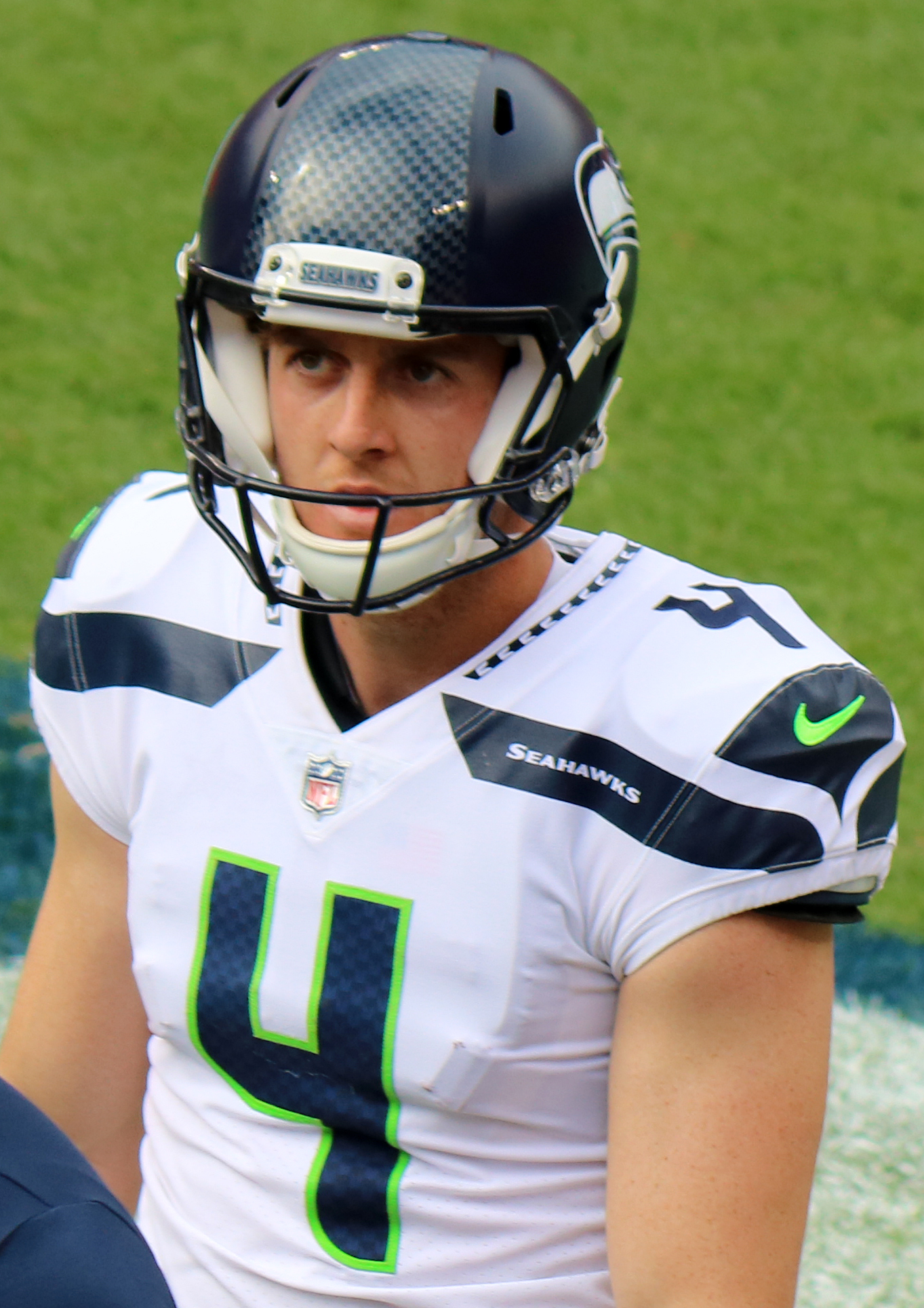
Dickson in 2018

=== 2018 season ===
Dickson made his NFL debut during the season opening 27–24 road loss to the Denver Broncos, punting six times for 354 net yards. Dickson was named NFC Special Teams Player of the Week for his performance in Week 8 against the Detroit Lions. With minutes remaining at fourth-and-8 from their own three-yard line, Dickson was instructed to waste time in the end zone before giving up an intentional safety. Instead, after receiving the snap, he ran it nine yards for the first down, sealing the win. The unscripted play was later dubbed "The Aussie Sweep." Dickson was named the NFC Special Teams Player of the Month for November 2018.

Dickson punted 78 times for 3,759 yards in the 2018 season as the Seahawks were eliminated in the first round ot the playoffs. His average of 48.2 yards per punt ranked as the second-highest in the league and his 51.4 yard per punt in the playoffs was highest in the league. In addition to punting, Dickson occasionally used the previously obscure drop kick maneuver on kickoffs for the Seahawks, both onside kicks and standard deep kicks. For his efforts, Dickson was voted into the 2019 Pro Bowl, the first rookie punter to participate since Dale Hatcher in 1985. Dickson was also named as a first-team All-Pro. He was named to the PFWA All-Rookie Team.

=== 2019 season ===
In the 2019 season, Dickson had 74 punts for 3,341 yards, an average of 45.2 yards per punt. The Seahawks made the playoffs again, but after beating Philadelphia in the Wild Card game, they lost to Green Bay in the divisional round. Against Green Bay, Dickson kicked the longest punt of the playoffs that year - a 64 yarder that resulted in a touchback.

=== 2020 season ===
In Week 2 of the 2020 season, against the New England Patriots on Sunday Night Football, Dickson punted four times (50-yard average) with all four of them landing inside the 20-yard line during the 35–30 victory. He was named the NFC Special Teams Player of the Week for the performance. In Week 15 against the Washington Football Team, Dickson punted four times, all landing inside the 20-yard-line, earning another NFC Special Teams Player of the Week honor. During the 2020 season, Dickson punted 61 times for 3,028 yards, with his punting average of 49.6 yards being the second-highest in the league, and the ninth highest single-season average of all time. In the Seahawks one playoff game, Dickson kicked a 71 yard punt and averaged 55.8 yards per punt to lead all punters in the playoffs that year.

=== 2021 season ===
Dickson signed a four-year, $14.5 million contract extension with the Seahawks on 4 June 2021.

During Week 5 of the 2021 season, in a game against the Los Angeles Rams, Dickson initially had a punt blocked. He then chased down the football behind the line of scrimmage, picking it up with one hand, and punting it for a second time while on the run, reminiscent of Australian rules football. The punt would go for 68 yards, his longest of the season, and be downed on the Rams' 10-yard line. The "double punt" received national attention due to its relative obscurity, and is considered one of the most memorable special teams plays of all time.

Dickson punted the ball a career-high 83 times for 3,895 yards during the 2021 season, an average of 46.9 yards per punt. He pinned 40 punts inside the opponents' 20-yard line, the most in the league that season, and the 10th most in a single season in NFL history.

=== 2022 season ===
In the 2022 season, Dickson punted 66 times for a 48.47 average. The Seahawks made it to the playoffs, and lost in the wild card round.

=== 2023 season ===
In the 2023 season, he punted 66 times with a 50.05 average.

=== 2024 season ===
In the 2024 season, he punted 76 times for a 49.42 average.

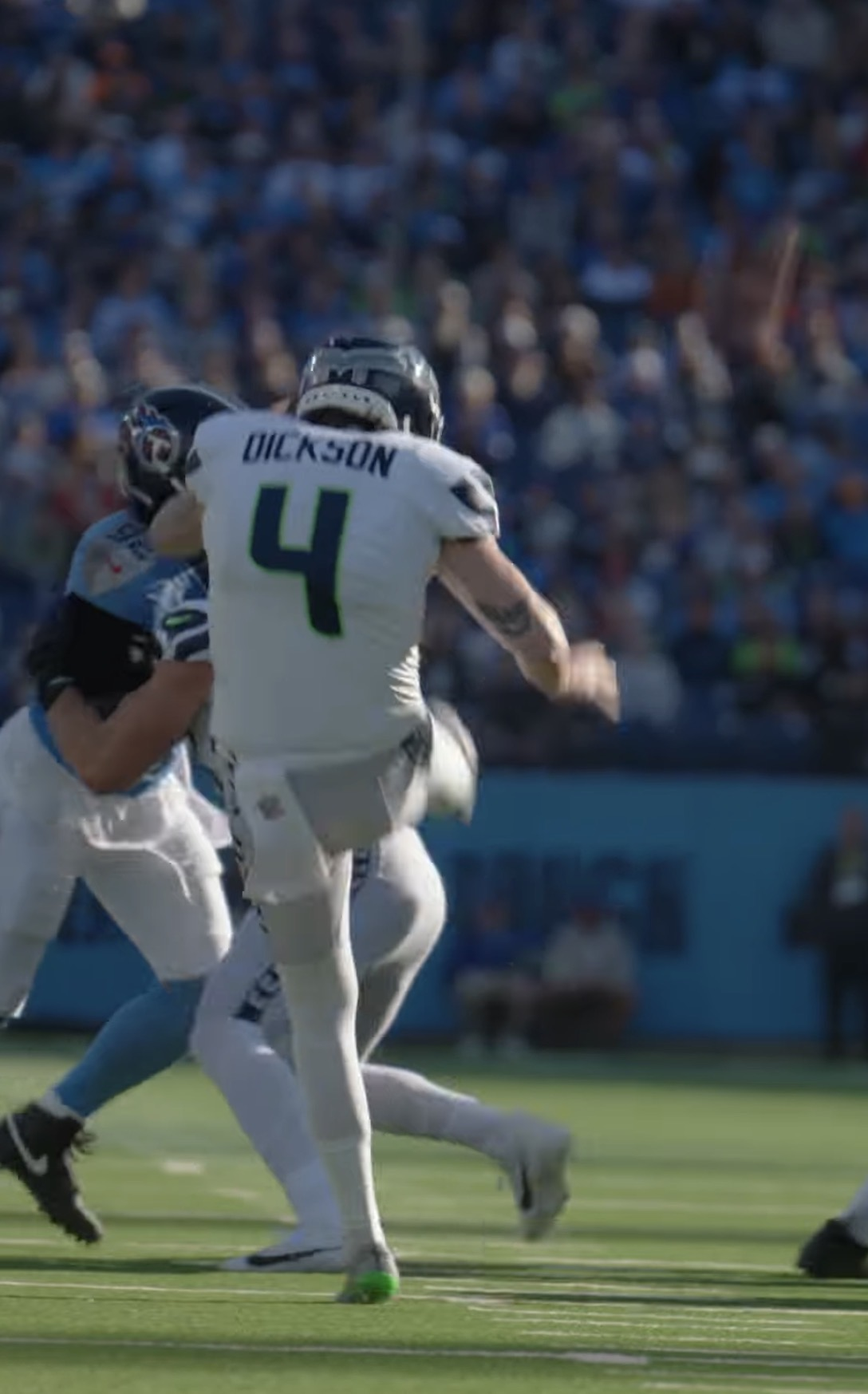
Dickson in 2025

He was voted 1st team all-pro by Pro Football Focus at the end of the season.

=== 2025 season ===
On June 10, 2025, Dickson agreed to a four-year, $16.2 million contract extension with the Seahawks, becoming the NFL's highest-paid punter.

In the 2025 season, he punted 52 times for 2,548 yards for a 49.0 average. He was named 1st team All-Pro by the Sporting News, 2nd team All-Pro by the AP and 1st team All-Conference by the Pro Football Writers.

Dickson and the Seahawks played in the Super Bowl at the end of the 2025 season, defeating the New England Patriots, 29–13, to win Super Bowl LX. Dickson's performance in Super Bowl LX was widely celebrated, as he punted seven times with an average of 47.9 yards per kick, holding the Patriots to just four return yards. With the win, Dickson became the third Australian player to win the Super Bowl, after Jordan Mailata and Jesse Williams.

== Career statistics ==
Legend
	Won the Super Bowl
	Led the league
	NFL record
**Bold**	Career high

=== NFL ===
==== Regular season ====
Year	Team	GP	Punting							
Year	Team	GP	Punts	Yds	Lng	Avg	Net Avg	Blk	Ins20	RetY
2018	SEA	16	78	3,759	69	48.2	42.5	**1**	28	**304**
2019	SEA	16	74	3,341	63	45.1	40.9	0	34	213
2020	SEA	16	61	3,028	67	49.6	44.4	0	32	199
2021	SEA	17	**83**	**3,895**	68	46.9	41.6	0	**40**	239
2022	SEA	17	66	3,199	68	48.5	**44.4**	0	22	207
2023	SEA	17	66	3,303	**73**	**50.0**	44.1	0	25	230
2024	SEA	17	76	3,756	68	49.4	43.3	0	31	284
2025	SEA	17	52	2,548	60	49.0	42.2	0	20	296
2026	SEA	10	40	1,825	58	45.6	43.6	0	16	50
Career		143	596	28,654	73	48.1	42.9	1	248	2,022

==== Postseason ====
Year	Team	GP	Punting					
Year	Team	GP	Punts	Yds	Lng	Avg	Blk	Ins20
2018	SEA	1	7	360	60	51.4	0	0
2019	SEA	2	7	325	64	46.4	0	0
2020	SEA	1	8	446	**71**	**55.8**	0	0
2022	SEA	1	4	194	60	48.5	0	1
2025	SEA	**3**	**15**	**710**	56	47.3	0	**10**
Career		8	41	2,035	71	49.6	0	11

=== College ===
Year	School	Conf	Class	Pos	G	Punting		
Year	School	Conf	Class	Pos	G	**Punts**	**Yds**	**Avg**
2015	Texas	Big 12	FR	P	12	77	3,179	41.3
2016	Texas	Big 12	SO	P	12	65	3,079	**47.4**
2017	Texas	Big 12	JR	P	13	**84**	**3,984**	**47.4**
**Career**	**Texas**				**37**	**226**	**10,242**	**45.3**

== See also ==
- List of players who have converted from one football code to another
