= Joe Bill Baumgardner =

American football player (1925–2005)

- Baumgardner, circa 1948

No. 11
- Position: Halfback

Personal information
- Born: February 16, 1925; Shamrock, Texas, U.S.
- Died: June 8, 2005 (aged 80)
- Listed height: 6 ft 1 in (1.85 m)
- Listed weight: 198 lb (90 kg)

Career information
- High school: Stephen F. Austin (Austin, Texas)
- College: Southwestern (1943–1944); Texas (1945–1946)
- NFL draft: 1947: 28th round, 265th overall pick

Career history
- Chicago Bears (1948)*; Detroit Lions (1948)
- * Offseason or practice squad member only
- Stats at Pro Football Reference

Joseph William Baumgardner (February 16, 1925 – June 8, 2005) was an American professional football halfback who played for the Detroit Lions of the National Football League (NFL). He played college football for the Southwestern Pirates and Texas Longhorns. He was selected by the Chicago Bears in the 28th round of the 1947 NFL draft.

== Early life ==
Joseph William Baumgardner was born on February 16, 1925, in Shamrock, Texas. He played high school football at Stephen F. Austin High School in Austin, Texas from 1941 to 1942, helping them win a state title.

== College career ==
Baumgardner enlisted in the United States Navy and enrolled at The University of Texas to play for the Longhorns. However, due to the V-12 Navy College Training Program, the Navy sent Baumgardner to Southwestern University. He lettered for the Southwestern Pirates from 1943 to 1944. Baumgardner rejoined the Longhorns, and lettered for them from 1945 to 1946. He was the Longhorns' starting right halfback during the 1946 season. Baumgardner participated in track for the Longhorns as well.

== Professional career ==
Baumgardner was selected by the Chicago Bears in the 28th round, with the 265th overall pick, of the 1947 NFL draft. In 1947, he took the year off for law school. On February 8, 1948, he signed a one-year contract with the Bears worth $6,000. On September 8, 1948, the Detroit Lions purchased Baumgardner from the Bears. He played in two games for the Lions during the 1948 NFL season before being released on October 6, 1948.

== Personal life ==
Baumgardner died on June 8, 2005.
