= Joseph Williams (Connecticut politician) =

American politician (1779–1865)

Member of the Connecticut House of Representatives from the Norwich district
- In office 1813–1814

Personal details
- Born: March 29, 1779 Norwich, Connecticut, U.S.
- Died: November 28, 1865 (aged 86) Norwich, Connecticut, U.S.
- Spouse: Rebecca Hoit (m. 1815; died 1841)
- Children: 5
- Education: Yale College; Litchfield Law School
- Occupation: Politician

Joseph Williams (March 29, 1779 – November 28, 1865) was an American politician.

== Early life ==
Joseph Williams was born on March 29, 1779, in Norwich, Connecticut, to Abigail (née Coit) and General Joseph Williams. He studied under Timothy Dwight IV at his academy on Greenfield Hill. He graduated from Yale College in 1798. He studied law at Litchfield Law School. He studied law under Simeon Baldwin. He stopped studying when his father died in October 1800 and he returned home.

== Career ==
In 1803, Williams became secretary and treasurer of the Norwich Fire Insurance Society. He was cashier of the Merchants Bank for over 40 years. He was justice of the peace for 40 years. He was an alderman of Norwich for 22 years.

Williams represented Norwich in the Connecticut House of Representatives from 1813 to 1814. He was states agent for the Mohegan Tribe. He was a projector and served as president of the Norwich Savings Society.

== Personal life ==
Williams married Rebecca Coit, daughter of Mehitable (née Tyler) and John Coit, on February 19, 1815. She was his first cousin once removed and the widow of his cousin Daniel T. Coit. They had three sons and two daughters. His wife died in 1841.

In July 1864, Williams injured himself in a fall and remained in his room due to the injury. He died on November 28, 1865, in Norwich.
