= Joel Williams (offensive lineman) =

American football player (1926–1997)

- Williams from cover of a 1950 program

No. 22, 20, 49, 54
- Position: Center

Personal information
- Born: March 18, 1926; San Angelo, Texas, U.S.
- Died: March 10, 1997 (aged 70); Odessa, Texas, U.S.
- Listed height: 6 ft 1 in (1.85 m)
- Listed weight: 220 lb (100 kg)

Career information
- College: Louisiana; Texas
- NFL draft: 1948: 22nd round, 198th overall pick

Career history
- San Francisco 49ers (1948); Richmond Rebels (1949); Baltimore Colts (1950); Edmonton Eskimos (1951); Hamilton Tiger-Cats (1952)

Awards and highlights
- AFL champion (1949); All-AFL team (1949); Southwest Conference champion (1947); Sugar Bowl champion (1948)

Career NFL/AAFC statistics
- Games played: 26
- Games started: 26
- Total touchdowns: 1
- Stats at Pro Football Reference

Joel Herschel Williams (March 18, 1926 – March 10, 1997) was an American football center in the National Football League (NFL) for the Baltimore Colts; in the All-America Football Conference for the San Francisco 49ers; in the American Football League for the Richmond Rebels and in the Canadian Football League for the Edmonton Eskimos and the Hamilton Tiger-Cats. Williams played college football at the University of Texas.

Williams was born in San Angelo Texas and played high school football at Central High school there where he was 1st Team All-State and helped the team win the 1943 State Championship. He stated college at the Southwestern Louisiana Institute of Liberal and Technical Learning and spent time in the Navy before ending up at Texas. There he played on the JV team in 1946 and made the varsity in 1947. That season, led by Bobby Layne, the Longhorns went 10-1, won the Southwest Conference Championship and then the 1948 Sugar Bowl.

== Professional career ==
He was drafted in the 22nd round of the 1948 NFL draft by the Washington Redskins.

In March 1948 he was signed by the 49ers of the All-America Football Conference. He helped the 49ers have a record-setting rushing attack: the team rushed for a staggering 3,653 yards in only fourteen games, a professional football record that still stands. Nonetheless, he was released in August 1949, just before the 1949 season started.

Later in 1949, he was playing with the minor league Richmond Rebels when he was signed by the Redskins; but the Redskins had to give him up after the Rebels sued. That season he made the American Football league's All-AFL team and helped them to win the League Championship over the Patterson Panthers.

In the summer of 1950 he was purchase by the Colts and spent the 1950 NFL season with them.

When the Colts disbanded after the 1950 season he was drafted by the New York Giants in the 7th Round (85th overall) of the 1951 NFL draft. He became a free agent and then signed with the Giants. But he never played with New York and instead, a month after signing with the Giants he headed to Canada after signing with the Eskimos which offered competitive pay. He played in 13 games for the Eskimos, missing a few with a knee injury, but returned for the playoffs where he had 2 interceptions in the first game against Winnipeg, helping the Eskimos to win 4-1.

The Eskimos decided not to resign Williams and he signe with the Hamilton Tiger-Cats in July of 1952. He played in two games for the Ti-Cats throughout the season and was cut in late September to meet the Oct 1 import player deadline.

In 1950, he also worked as an assistant coach at Angelo State University.
