= Texas Longhorns football =

College football team representing the University of Texas at Austin

2026 Texas Longhorns football team
- First season: 1893; 133 years ago
- Athletic director: Chris Del Conte
- General manager: Brandon Harris
- Head coach: Steve Sarkisian; 6th season, 57–22 (.722)
- Location: Austin, Texas
- Stadium: Darrell K Royal–Texas Memorial Stadium (capacity: 100,119)
- Field: Campbell–Williams Field
- NCAA division: Division I FBS
- Conference: SEC
- Colors: Burnt orange and white
- All-time record: 980–399–33 (.706)
- CFP record: 2–2 (.500)
- Bowl record: 33–27–2 (.548)

National championships
- Claimed: 1963, 1969, 1970, 2005
- Unclaimed: 1914, 1941, 1968, 1977, 1981

National finalist
- Poll era: 1963
- BCS: 2005, 2009

College Football Playoff appearances
- 2023, 2024

Conference championships
- TIAA: 1913, 1914 SWC: 1916, 1918, 1920, 1928, 1930, 1942, 1943, 1945, 1950, 1952, 1953, 1959, 1961, 1962, 1963, 1968, 1969, 1970, 1971, 1972, 1973, 1975, 1977, 1983, 1990, 1994, 1995 Big 12: 1996, 2005, 2009, 2023

Division championships
- Big 12 South: 1996, 1999, 2001, 2002, 2005, 2008, 2009
- Heisman winners: Earl Campbell – 1977; Ricky Williams – 1998
- Consensus All-Americans: 63
- Rivalries: Arkansas (rivalry); Baylor (rivalry); Oklahoma (rivalry); Rice (rivalry); TCU (rivalry); Texas A&M (rivalry); Texas Tech (rivalry)

Uniforms
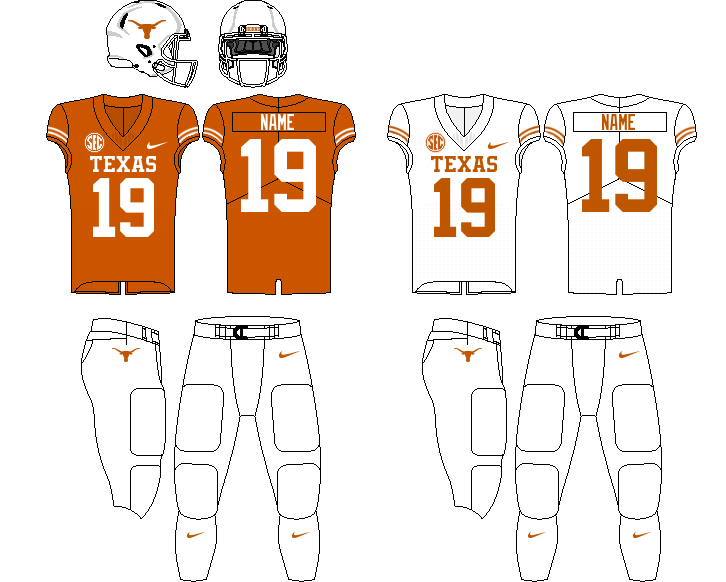
- Fight song: Texas Fight
- Mascot: Bevo
- Marching band: The University of Texas Longhorn Band
- Outfitter: Nike
- Website: texaslonghorns.com/football

The Texas Longhorns football program represents the University of Texas at Austin (variously "Texas" or "UT") in American football. It is part of the wider Longhorns athletics program and competes at the NCAA Division I Football Bowl Subdivision (FBS) level as a member of the Southeastern Conference.

The program has been recognized as one of the most elite in college football. Texas began competing in 1893. The Longhorns claim four consensus national championships (1963, 1969, 1970, and 2005), and have been lead by three Hall of Fame coaches in their history. Dana X. Bible coached from 1936 to 1946, compiling a 63–31–3 record. Darrell Royal won three of Texas' national championships during his tenure from 1957 to 1976. Head coach Mack Brown won 158 games and a national championship between 1998 and 2013. Two Longhorn players have been awarded the Heisman Trophy, running backs Earl Campbell and Ricky Williams in 1977 and 1998, respectively.

Texas has an overall record of 975–397–33, the seventh best win–loss record in Division I FBS, and ranks fifth in all-time total victories. Texas has won 31 conference championships and appeared in 63 postseason bowl games. The program has 27 seasons with ten wins or more and 34 total bowl victories. the Longhorns hold the record for most Southwest Conference championships at 25 and Cotton Bowl Classic appearances at 23. Through the 2025 season, the Associated Press (AP) ranks Texas tenth in all-time final AP Poll appearances with 53. The program has also produced one hundred First Team All-Americans (63 consensus and 27 unanimous) and 387 NFL draftees since 1938.

Since 1924, the Longhorns have played their home games at Darrell K Royal–Texas Memorial Stadium in Austin, Texas, the ninth largest stadium in the world. The team is represented by their live mascot, Bevo, a Texas Longhorn steer with burnt orange and white coloring. Win or lose, Longhorns fans and players sing 'The Eyes of Texas' before and after every game, alongside their fight song, 'Texas Fight'.

== History ==
Photograph of the 1893 football team

Beginning in 1893, the Texas Longhorns football program is one of the most highly regarded and historic programs of all time. From 1936 to 1946 the team was led by Hall of Fame coach Dana X. Bible, and then from 1957 to 1976 the team was led by Hall of Fame coach Darrell K Royal, who won three national championships. The first championship was in 1963 (11–0 record, culminating with a Cotton Bowl victory over No. 2 Navy) and the second in 1969 (11–0 record, including a victory over No. 2 Arkansas in the "Game of the Century" and a Cotton Bowl victory over Notre Dame). From 1998 to 2013, the Longhorns were coached by Mack Brown. During Brown's tenure, Texas won two Big 12 Conference championships, and a national championship in 2005 (13–0 record, including a victory over USC in the Rose Bowl). Texas last appeared in a national championship game in 2009, losing to Alabama.

In 2009, ESPN ranked Texas as the seventh-most prestigious college football program since 1936. In 2012, the football program was valued at $805 million, more than the calculated value of several NFL teams. Texas is known for their post-season appearances, ranking second in number of bowl game appearances (55), fourth in bowl game victories (29), most Southwest Conference football championships (27), and most Cotton Bowl Classic appearances and victories. Other NCAA records include 108 winning seasons out of 122 total seasons, 24 seasons with 10 or more wins, 9 undefeated seasons, and 26 seasons with at most one loss or tie. From 1936 to 2012, the Longhorns football teams have been in the AP or coaches' rankings 66 out of 76 seasons (86.8% of the time), finishing those seasons ranked in the top twenty-five 48 times and the top ten 28 times. Texas claims four Division I-A national championships (1963, 1969, 1970 and 2005) and 33 conference championships (4 Big 12 Conference, 27 Southwest Conference, and 2 Texas Intercollegiate Athletic Association).

A total of 129 (53 consensus and 22 unanimous) Texas players have been named to College Football All-America Teams, while two Longhorn players, Earl Campbell (1977) and Ricky Williams (1998), have won the Heisman Trophy, "College football's most prestigious individual honor". Seventeen Longhorns have been inducted into the College Football Hall of Fame, while four are enshrined in the Pro Football Hall of Fame.

At the start of the 2019 season, Texas' all-time record was 909–371–33 (.705), which ranked as the third-most wins. By the end of the season, Texas' record was 916–375–33 (.704), losing a spot and dropping to fourth in NCAA Division I FBS overall history.

In July 2021, after 25 seasons as members of the Big 12, Texas and rival Oklahoma accepted invitations to join the Southeastern Conference (SEC) no later than the 2025 season. In February 2023, the Big 12 announced that the two schools had negotiated a combined $100 million early termination fee in order to leave for the SEC a year before the schools' media rights deal with the Big 12 was set to expire. The Longhorns football team continued competing in the Big 12 through the 2023 season before moving to the SEC in 2024.

== Conference affiliations ==
Texas joined the Southeastern Conference in 2024.

Texas has been affiliated with four conferences and twice been an independent.

- Independent (1893–1895, 1905–1912)
- Southern Intercollegiate Athletic Association (1896–1904)
- Texas Intercollegiate Athletic Association (1909–1914)
- Southwest Conference (1915–1995)
- Big 12 Conference (1996–2023)
- Southeastern Conference (2024–present)

== Championships ==
=== National championships ===
Texas has been selected national champion in 9 seasons from NCAA-designated major selectors, including 4 from the major wire-service: AP Poll and/or Coaches' Poll. The 1963, 1969, 1970, and 2005 championships are claimed by the school, while the remainder are not claimed.

==== Claimed national championships ====
Year	Coach	Selectors	Record	Bowl	Final AP	Final Coaches
1963	Darrell Royal	AP, FWAA, NFF, UPI (Coaches)	11–0	W Cotton	No. 1	No. 1
1969	Darrell Royal	AP, FWAA, NFF, UPI (Coaches), Richard Nixon (Note: Not an NCAA-designated major selector.)	11–0	W Cotton	No. 1	No. 1
1970	Darrell Royal	NFF (co-champion), UPI (Coaches)	10–1	L Cotton	No. 3	No. 1
2005	Mack Brown	AP, BCS, FWAA, NFF, USA Today (Coaches)	13–0	W Rose (BCS National Championship Game)	No. 1	No. 1

==== Unclaimed national championships ====
Year	Coach	Selectors	Record	Bowl	Final AP	Final Coaches
1914	David Allerdice	Billingsley Report (co-champion)	8–0		–	–
1941	Dana X. Bible	Berryman, Williamson System	8–1–1		No. 4	–
1968	Darrell Royal	Devold System, Matthews Grid Ratings, Sagarin (co-champion)	9–1–1	W Cotton	No. 3	No. 5
1977	Fred Akers	Berryman, R(FACT) (co-champion), Sagarin (ELO-Chess) (co-champion)	11–1	L Cotton	No. 4	No. 5
1981	Fred Akers	National Championship Foundation (co-champion)	10–1–1	W Cotton	No. 2	No. 4

=== Conference championships ===
Texas has won 34 conference championships, 27 outright and six shared, spanning three conferences, the Texas Intercollegiate Athletic Association, the Southwest Conference, and the Big 12 Conference.

Year	Conference	Coach	Overall record	Conference record
1911	TIAA	Dave Allerdice	5–2	3–0
1914	TIAA	Dave Allerdice	7–1	3–0
1914	TIAA	Dave Allerdice	8–0	4–0
1916	Southwest Conference	Eugene Van Gent	7–2	5–1
1918	Southwest Conference	William Juneau	9–0	4–0
1920	Southwest Conference	Berry Whitaker	9–0	5–0
1928	Southwest Conference	Clyde Littlefield	7–2	5–1
1930	Southwest Conference	Clyde Littlefield	8–1–1	4–1
1942	Southwest Conference	Dana X. Bible	9–2	5–1
1943	Southwest Conference	Dana X. Bible	7–1–1	5–0
1945	Southwest Conference	Dana X. Bible	10–1	5–1
1950	Southwest Conference	Blair Cherry	9–2	6–0
1952	Southwest Conference	Ed Price	9–2	6–0
1953†	Southwest Conference	Ed Price	7–3	5–1
1959†	Southwest Conference	Darrell Royal	9–2	5–1
1961†	Southwest Conference	Darrell Royal	10–1	6–1
1962	Southwest Conference	Darrell Royal	9–1–1	6–0–1
1963	Southwest Conference	Darrell Royal	11–0	7–0
1968	Southwest Conference	Darrell Royal	9–1–1	6–1
1969	Southwest Conference	Darrell Royal	11–0	7–0
1970	Southwest Conference	Darrell Royal	10–1	7–0
1971	Southwest Conference	Darrell Royal	8–3	6–1
1972	Southwest Conference	Darrell Royal	10–1	7–0
1973	Southwest Conference	Darrell Royal	8–3	7–0
1975†	Southwest Conference	Darrell Royal	10–2	6–1
1977	Southwest Conference	Fred Akers	11–1	8–0
1983	Southwest Conference	Fred Akers	10–1	7–0
1990	Southwest Conference	David McWilliams	10–2	8–0
1994†	Southwest Conference	John Mackovic	8–4	4–3
1995	Southwest Conference	John Mackovic	10–2–1	7–0
1996	Big 12 Conference	John Mackovic	8–5	6–2
2005	Big 12 Conference	Mack Brown	13–0	8–0
2009	Big 12 Conference	Mack Brown	13–1	9–0
2023	Big 12 Conference	Steve Sarkisian	13–2	8–1

† Co-champions

=== Division championships ===
Texas has won a share of 7 Big 12 South titles, 5 of which resulted in an appearance in the Big 12 Championship Game. Texas is 3–2 in those appearances. As of 2011, the new ten-team Big 12 Conference ceased to have divisions and conference championship games.

Year	Division	Coach	Opponent	CG result	Notes
1996	Big 12 South	John Mackovic	Nebraska	W 37–27	notes
1999	Big 12 South	Mack Brown	Nebraska	L 6–22	notes
2001	Big 12 South	Mack Brown	Colorado	L 37–39	notes
2002†	Big 12 South	Mack Brown	N/A lost tiebreaker to Oklahoma		notes
2005	Big 12 South	Mack Brown	Colorado	W 70–3	notes
2008†	Big 12 South	Mack Brown	N/A lost tiebreaker to Oklahoma		notes
2009	Big 12 South	Mack Brown	Nebraska	W 13–12	notes

† Co-champions

== Bowl games ==
At the end of the 2018 season, Texas is tied for second in all time bowl appearances in the NCAA FBS at 55, matching Georgia and trailing Alabama's 70 appearances. (Note: Some years Texas went to two bowls although they were in different seasons)

Bowl game	No. of appearances	First year	Last year	Bowl record
Alamo Bowl	6	2006	2022	4–2–0
BCS National Championship	2^	2006^	2010	1–1–0^
Bluebonnet Bowl†	6	1960	1987	3–2–1
Citrus Bowl	1	2025	2025	1–0–0
College Football Playoff First Round	1	2024	2024	1–0–0
Cotton Bowl	23	1943	2025	11–11–1
Fiesta Bowl	2	1997	2009	1–1–0
Freedom Bowl‡	1	1984	1984	0–1–0
Gator Bowl	1	1974	1974	0–1–0
Holiday Bowl	5	2000	2011	3–2–0
Orange Bowl	2	1949	1965	2–0–0
Peach Bowl	1	2025	2025	1–0–0
Rose Bowl	2^	2005	2006^	2–0–0^
Sugar Bowl	5	1948	2024	2–3–0
Sun Bowl	4	1978	1994	2–2–0
Texas Bowl†	2	2014	2017	1–1–0
Total bowl appearances	62	Total bowl record		33–27–2

^ The 2006 Rose Bowl was both the Rose Bowl Game and the sanctioned BCS National Championship Game, after that season the BCS NCG became a separate game unaffiliated with the major bowl games.

† The Bluebonnet Bowl in Houston was discontinued in 1988, but was replaced by the Houston Bowl (2000–2001) and the Texas Bowl (2006–current).

‡ The Freedom Bowl merged with the Holiday Bowl in 1995.

New Year's Six bowls and Bowl Championship Series games

Texas has played in four Bowl Championship Series games (including two BCS National Championships) and one New Year's Six bowl. Texas also played in two Bowl Alliance games (the precursor to the BCS): the 1995 Sugar Bowl and the 1997 Fiesta Bowl. The Longhorns are also the only team to have won all six of the New Year's Six bowls, achieved after winning the 2025 Peach Bowl.

Season	Game	Opponent	Result
2004	Rose Bowl	No. 12 Michigan	W 38–37
2005	Rose Bowl (BCS National Championship Game)	No. 1 USC	W 41–38
2008	Fiesta Bowl	No. 10 Ohio State	W 24–21
2009	BCS National Championship Game	No. 1 Alabama	L 21–37
2018	Sugar Bowl	No. 5 Georgia	W 28–21
2023	Sugar Bowl	No. 2 Washington	L 37–31
2024	Peach Bowl	No. 12 Arizona State	W 39–31
2024	Cotton Bowl	No. 6 Ohio State	L 14–28

== College Football Playoff ==
Since the College Football Playoff's formation in 2014 the Longhorns have appeared twice. Their first appearance came in 2023, the last year of the 4-team format. Their second and most recent appearance was in 2024. The Horns have compiled a 2-2 (.500) record through these appearances.

Season	Seed	Game	Opponent	Location	Result
2023	3rd	Sugar Bowl (Playoff Semifinal)	No. 2 Washington	Caesars Superdome • New Orleans, LA	L 31-37
2024	5th	CFP First Round	No. 16 (12) Clemson	Darrell K Royal–Texas Memorial Stadium • Austin, TX	W 38-24
2024	5th	Peach Bowl (Playoff Quarterfinal)	No. 12 (4) Arizona State	Mercedes-Benz Stadium • Atlanta, GA	W 39-31 (2OT)
2024	5th	Cotton Bowl (Playoff Semifinal)	No. 6 (8) Ohio State*	AT&T Stadium • Arlington, TX	L 14-28

* The eventual national champion.

== Head coaches ==
There have been 31 head coaches since the inaugural team in 1893, with Steve Sarkisian being the current head coach of the Longhorns.

No.	Coach	Seasons	Years	Record	Pct
	No coach	1	1893	4–0	1.000
1	Reginald DeMerritt Wentworth	1	1894	6–1	.857
2	Frank Crawford	1	1895	5–0	1.000
3	Harry Orman Robinson	1	1896	4–2–1	.643
4	Walter F. Kelly	1	1897	6–2	.750
5	David Farragut Edwards	1	1898	5–1	.833
6	Maurice Gordon Clarke	1	1899	6–2	.750
7	Samuel Huston Thompson	2	1900–1901	14–2–1	.853
8	J. B. Hart	1	1902	6–3–1	.650
9	Ralph Hutchinson	3	1903–1905	16–7–2	.680
10	H. R. Schenker	1	1906	9–1	.900
11	W. E. Metzenthin	2	1907–1908	11–5–1	.676
12	Dexter W. Draper	1	1909	4–3–1	.563
13	Billy Wasmund	1	1910	6–2	.750
14	Dave Allerdice	5	1911–1915	33–7	.825
15	Eugene Van Gent	1	1916	7–2	.778
16	William Juneau	3	1917–1919	19–7	.731
17	Berry Whitaker	3	1920–1922	22–3–1	.865
18	E. J. Stewart	4	1923–1926	24–9–3	.708
19	Clyde Littlefield	7	1927–1933	44–18–6	.691
20	Jack Chevigny	3	1934–1936	13–14–2	.483
21	Dana X. Bible	10	1937–1946	63–31–3	.665
22	Blair Cherry	4	1947–1950	32–10–1	.756
23	Ed Price	6	1951–1956	33–27–1	.549
24	Darrell Royal	20	1957–1976	167–47–5	.774
25	Fred Akers	10	1977–1986	86–31–2	.731
26	David McWilliams	5	1987–1991	31–26	.544
27	John Mackovic	6	1992–1997	41–28–2	.592
28	Mack Brown	16	1998–2013	158–48	.767
29	Charlie Strong	3	2014–2016	16–21	.432
30	Tom Herman	4	2017–2020	32–18	.640
31	Steve Sarkisian	5	2021–present	45–19	.703

== Home stadium ==
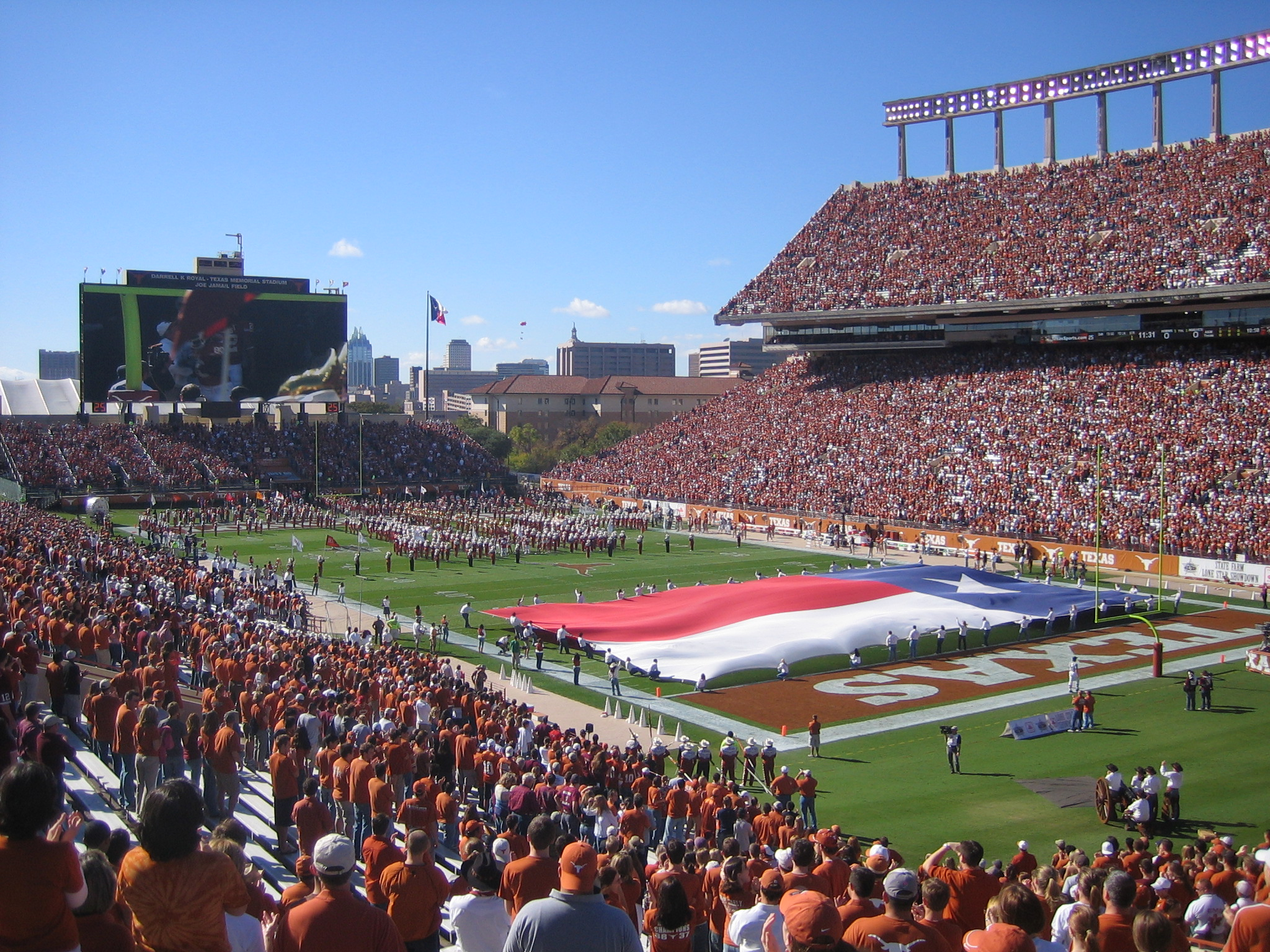
Darrell K Royal–Texas Memorial Stadium with a view of the Godzillatron

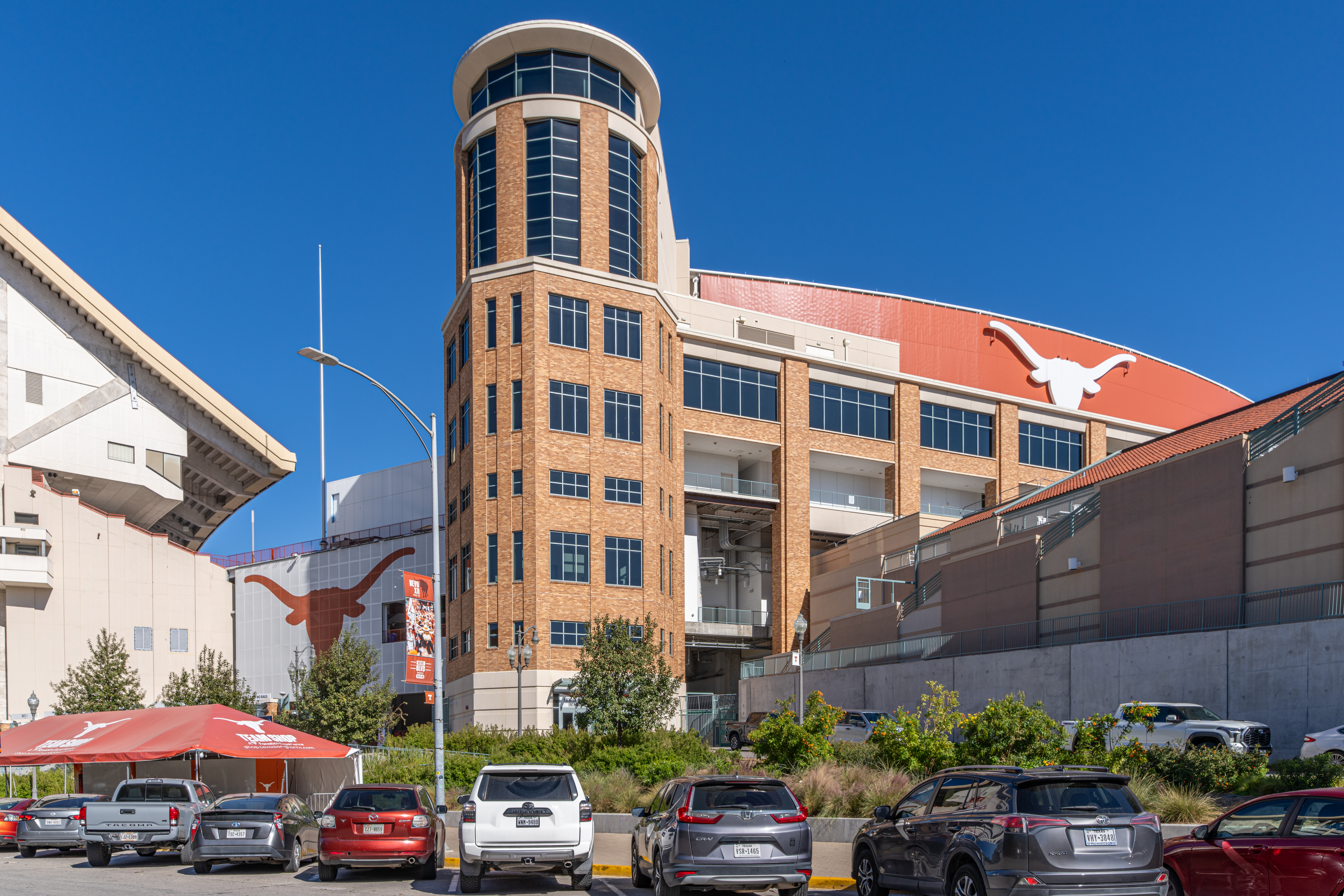
View of the post-2021 South Endzone from the southwest.

The Longhorns have played their home games in Darrell K Royal–Texas Memorial Stadium (formerly just "Memorial Stadium" and "Texas Memorial Stadium") on Campbell-Williams Field since 1924. The stadium is located on the campus of The University of Texas in Austin, Texas. The current official stadium capacity is 100,119, making it the second largest football venue in the state of Texas, the fourth largest in the SEC Conference, the seventh largest on-campus stadium in the NCAA, and the ninth largest non-racing stadium in the world.

The stadium has been expanded several times since its original opening, and now includes 100,119 permanent seats, and until 2019 included the nation's first high definition video display in a collegiate facility nicknamed "Godzillatron," until it was replaced by the new South Endzone Complex. The current DKR-Texas Memorial Stadium record was set on October 19, 2024, against Georgia with 105,215 spectators.

The final planned phase of the stadium's expansion includes the construction of permanent seating and an upper deck in the south end zone, completely enclosing the playing field. The stadium's seating capacity is expected to reach 112,000 once the south end zone is fully enclosed, which would mean DKR-Texas Memorial Stadium would surpass Michigan Stadium as the largest football stadium in North America. Construction began on a new South Endzone complex in 2019 and was completed in 2021, it included a larger digital video display, along with club and student seating.

Before the Longhorns football team moved to DKR, they played their home games at Clark Field from 1887 to 1924. Clark Field was a wooden-structured stadium located on the University of Texas campus. The Longhorns last game at Clark Field before moving to brand new Memorial Stadium occurred on October 25, 1924. The Longhorns battled the Florida Gators to a 7–7 tie that day. Texas finished with a record of 135–23–3 during their time at Clark Field.

== Rivalries ==
=== Oklahoma ===
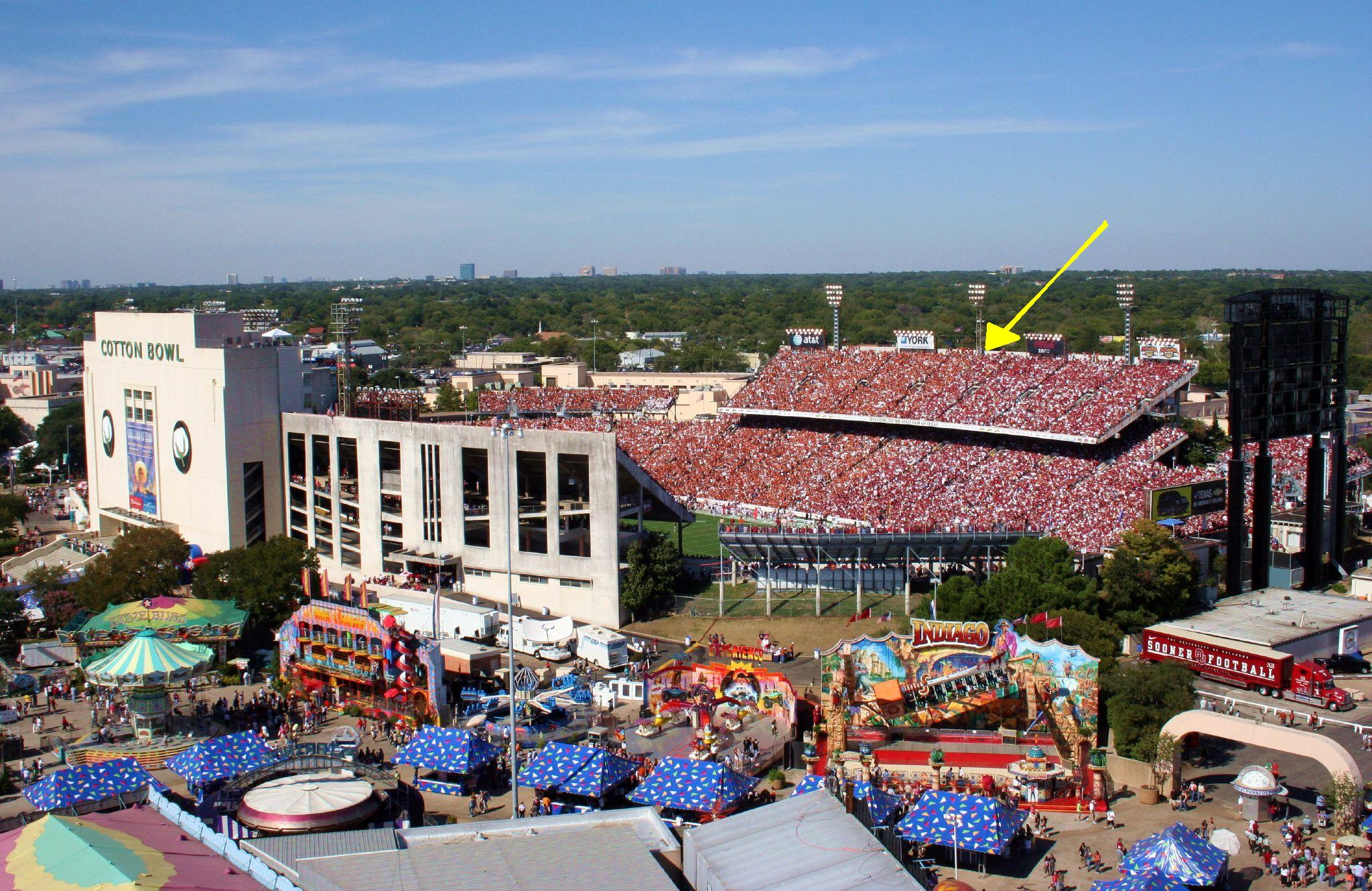
2006 Red River Rivalry with yellow arrow indicating the crowd split at the 50-yard line

Texas has a long-standing rivalry with the University of Oklahoma. The football game between the University of Texas and Oklahoma is commonly known as the "Red River Rivalry" and is held annually in Dallas at the Cotton Bowl. Dallas is used as a "neutral site" since it is approximately midway between the two campuses. The stadium is split, with each team having an equal number of supporters on each side of the 50 yard line. Texas state flags fly around the Longhorn end of the stadium and Oklahoma state flags fly around the Sooner end. This border rivalry is often considered to be one of the top five current rivalries in the NCAA. The Red River Shootout originated in 1900, while Oklahoma was still a territory of the United States, and it is the longest-running college-football rivalry played on a neutral field. Since 2005, the football game has received sponsorship dollars in return for being referred to as the "SBC Red River Rivalry" (changed to AT&T Red River Rivalry in 2006 after SBC merged with AT&T), a move which has been criticized both for its commercialism and its political correctness. The University of Texas holds its annual Torchlight Parade during the week of the Red River Rivalry. In 2005, the Dallas Morning News did an opinion poll of the 119 Division 1A football coaches as to the nations top rivalry game in college football. The Texas-OU game was ranked third. The game typically has conference or even national significance. Since 1945, one or both of the two teams has been ranked among the top 25 teams in the nation coming into 60 out of 65 games. Twice Texas has defeated the Sooners a record eight straight times from 1940 to 1947 and 1958–1965. One of the most significant meetings was in 1963 with Oklahoma ranked No. 1 and Texas ranked No. 2, the game won by Texas 28–7 en route to their first officially recognized national championship. The series has also had its share of games that came down to the wire and comebacks most recently in 2021 which saw sixth-ranked Sooners rallying from a 21-point first-quarter deficit to edge the 21st-ranked Longhorns 55–48 in the highest-scoring game in the rivalry. The game has also been the result of controversy. The meeting in 1976 was a heated affair as the Oklahoma staff was accused of spying on Texas' practices, a move later confirmed by former OU head coach Barry Switzer. In the 2008 season Texas scored 45 points over then No. 1 Oklahoma for the win, but even with the victory Texas would not go on to the Big 12 Championship game due to BCS rankings. Six of the last ten showings featured one of the participants in the BCS National Championship Game (2000, 2003–2005, 2008, 2009), including national titles won by Oklahoma in 2000 and by Texas in 2005. On October 6, 2018, the Longhorns and Sooners squared off in a Red River Rivalry game that will go down in history. After giving up a 21-point 4th Quarter lead, the Longhorns found themselves tied at 45 with the Sooners with just over two minutes left to play in the game. As the Longhorns began to systematically march down the field, time began to run out. However, a Cameron Dicker 40-yard field goal sealed a 48–45 win for the Longhorns and finally ended the 2-year drought in the Red River Rivalry.

In 2022, Texas shut out Oklahoma, beating them 49-0. This was the most dominant win by either side since 2003, and the first shut out since 2004.

Texas leads the all-time series 63–51–5 through the 2023 season. In 2023 Oklahoma surpassed Texas A&M as UT’s most played football rivalry game.

=== Texas Tech ===
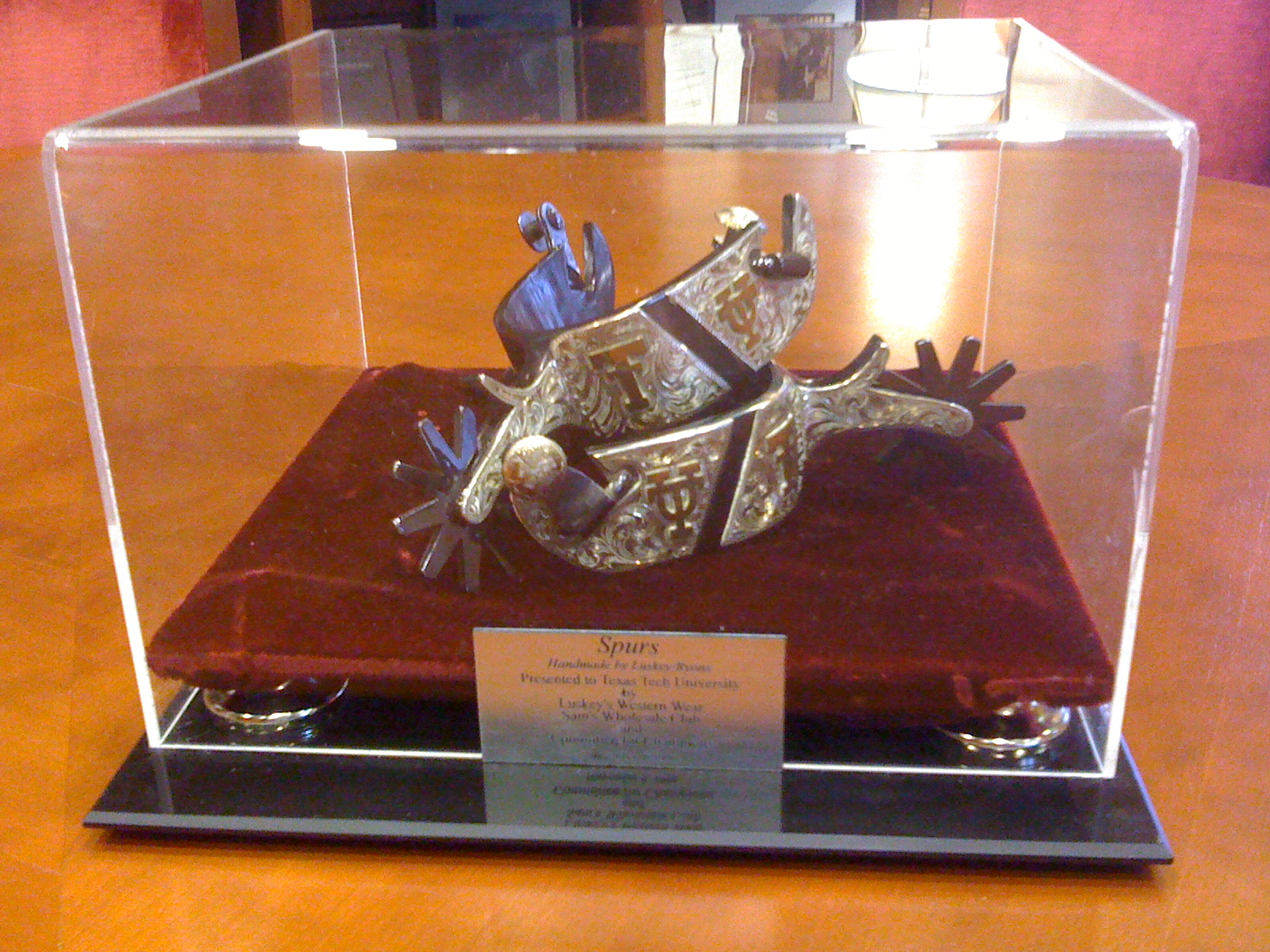
The Chancellor's Spurs is the traveling trophy between the Longhorns and Texas Tech Red Raiders

The first meeting between the Texas Longhorns and Texas Tech Matadors (as the team was known until 1937) was in 1928, a 12–0 win for Texas. The teams only faced each other nine times before 1960 with Texas holding an 8–1 record over Tech at the time. From 1960 to 1995, both schools played annually as members of the Southwest Conference. Since 1996, both schools have played as members of the Big 12 Conference. In 1996, the Texas Tech University System was established and the system's first chancellor, John T. Montford, a former member of the Texas State Senate, started the exchange of a traveling trophy between the two universities called the Chancellor's Spurs. The spurs are gold and silver and engraved with Texas Tech's Double T and Texas' interlocking UT logo and were first awarded to Texas after a 38–32 victory over the Red Raiders in Lubbock.

Texas leads the all-time series 54–18 through the 2023 season.

=== Arkansas ===
Old Southwest Conference rivals, Texas and Arkansas first met in 1894, a 54–0 win by Texas. In the days of the Southwest Conference, the game between the two schools usually decided which team would win the conference championship. Overall, Texas won the game about 71% of the time, which led to an incredibly fierce and intense rivalry. The two programs have met 79 times and have had many big games. The meeting in 1969 is the true Game of the Century commemorating the 100th year of college football, which led to the Longhorns' 1969 national championship. This game, which is commonly known as "Dixie's Last Stand" and The Big Shootout, still does not sit well with Razorback fans to this day. The game saw Arkansas lead throughout only to have Texas come from behind and win in the final minutes, 15–14. The game also saw former President Richard Nixon attend the game and crown the Longhorns the National Champion in the locker room. The Texas-Arkansas game has not been played annually since Arkansas's departure from the Southwest Conference to the Southeastern Conference in 1991. However, many Longhorn and Razorback fans still consider this matchup an important rivalry. Texas and Arkansas played in September 2008, with Texas winning, 52–10. Texas and Arkansas also played in the 2014 Texas Bowl, which Arkansas won, 31–7. Texas and Arkansas played in the 2021 regular season, with Arkansas winning by a score of 40–21.

Texas leads the series 57–23 through the 2024 season.

=== Texas A&M ===
The first meeting between the football squads of the University of Texas and Texas A&M was in 1894, a 38–0 win for Texas. In fact, Texas won its first seven games against the Aggies, all of them by shutout. By 1915 Texas held a 15–4–2 advantage against the Aggies. The game was a back and forth affair for the next twenty years as the home team usually took the victory in the game, however Texas still maintained the series lead. In 1940, Texas shutout the Aggies 7–0 and kept them from receiving the Rose Bowl bid that year. From that year forward Texas would go on to win 33 of the next 38 games over A&M. It was not until the mid-1980s that A&M developed a win streak over Texas and in the late 1990s and 2000s the rivalry would again go back to Longhorns. The Texas/Texas A&M rivalry has given rise to several stereotypes on both sides: Texas A&M is generally portrayed as the rural smaller school while Texas is portrayed as the urban-wealthy larger school. With the exception of the 1994 game, when A&M's probation restricted the Aggies from being televised, the annual football game with Texas A&M traditionally takes place on Thanksgiving Day or the day after each year. This iconic in-state rivalry is often considered one of the top college rivalries of all time. In July 2011, Texas A&M elected to join the Southeastern Conference beginning in 2012, which ended of the 118-year consecutive meetings between the two schools. On November 24, 2011, Texas faced Texas A&M in College Station in the final scheduled meeting of the rivalry as of January 2019. Texas defeated Texas A&M 27–25 on a last second field goal to win the final meeting. In an attempt to generate more attention for the rivalry in sports other than football, the two schools created the Lone Star Showdown in 2004. Essentially, each time the two schools meet in a sport, the winner of the matchup gets a point. At the end of the year, the school with the most points wins the series and receives the Lone Star Trophy.

The Rivalry resumed in 2024 with Texas Joining the Southeastern Conference, visiting and defeating the Aggies 17–7 in a game which saw Texas A&M failing to score a single offensive point.

Texas leads the series 78–37–5 through the 2025 season.

=== Baylor ===
Baylor and Texas have played each other 111 times, with the first game between Baylor and Texas being played in 1901. Only Oklahoma and Texas A&M have played Texas more times than Baylor. Both Baylor and Texas were founding members of the Southwest Conference and the Big 12 Conference. Texas leads the series with Baylor 81-28-4. However, starting in 2010 this rivalry intensified as Baylor established themselves as a major contender in the BIG 12 Conference with Baylor playing for 4 BIG 12 titles and winning 3, including a head-to-head win over Texas to clinch the Big 12 Championship in 2013, in what is now known as the "Ice Bowl". Losing the BIG 12 Title to Baylor 30–10 was Mack Brown's last regular season game as the head coach at Texas.

Since 2015, Texas holds a 7–2 edge in the series with Baylor.

=== TCU ===
Texas leads the series with TCU 64–28–1 through the 2024 season.

=== Rice ===
Texas leads the series 75–21–1 through the 2023 season. The teams were conference rivals for 81 seasons in the Southwest Conference from 1915 through 1995.

== All-time series records ==
SEC opponents (Note: The Big 12 announced in February 2023 that Texas will begin to play in the SEC in 2024.)
Opponent	First meeting	Last meeting	Overall	SEC	Big 12	SWC	Rivalry
Alabama	1902	2023	TEX 8–2–1	–	–	–	
Arkansas	1894	2024	TEX 58–23	TEX 2–0	–	TEX 46–19	Arkansas–Texas football rivalry
Auburn	1910	1991	TEX 5–3	–	–	–	
Florida	1924	2024	TEX 3–1–1	TIE 1–1	–	–	
Georgia	1948	2025	TEX 4–4	UGA 3–0	–	–	
Kentucky	1951	2024	TEX 2–0	TEX 2–0	–	–	
LSU	1896	2019	TEX 9–8–1	–	–	–	
Mississippi State	1921	2024	TEX 4-2	TEX 2–0	–	–	
Missouri	1894	2017	TEX 18–6	–	TEX 7–2	–	
Oklahoma	1900	2024	TEX 65-51–5	TEX 2–0	OU 18–11	OU 3–1	Red River Rivalry
Ole Miss	1912	2013	TEX 6–2	–	–	–	
South Carolina	1957	1957	SC 1–0	–	–	–	
Tennessee	1950	2026	TEX 3–1	TEX 1-0	–	–	
Texas A&M	1894	2024	TEX 78-37–5	TEX 2-0	TEX 11–5	TEX 50–28–3	Lone Star Showdown
Vanderbilt	1899	2025	VU 8–5–1	TEX 2–0	–	–	

Former Big 12 and SWC opponents
Opponent	First meeting	Last meeting	Overall	Big 12	SWC	Rivalry
BYU	1987	2023	BYU 4–2	TEX 1–0	–	
Baylor	1901	2023	TEX 81–28–4	TEX 21–7	TEX 50–21–4	
Colorado	1940	2020	TEX 12–7	TEX 8–3	–	
Houston	1953	2023	TEX 17–7–2	TEX 1–0	TEX 12–7–1	
Iowa State	1979	2023	TEX 16-5	TEX 15-5	–	
Kansas	1901	2023	TEX 18–5	TEX 18–3	–	
Kansas State	1913	2023	TEX 14–10	TEX 11–9	–	
Nebraska	1933	2010	TEX 10-4	TEX 9-1	–	
Oklahoma State	1916	2023	TEX 27–11	TEX 18–10	–	
Rice	1914	2023	TEX 75–21–1	–	TEX 59–21–1	Rice–Texas football rivalry
SMU	1916	1995	TEX 47–22–4	–	TEX 46–22–4	
TCU	1897	2023	TEX 65–28–1	TCU 8–4	TEX 49–20–1	TCU–Texas football rivalry
Texas Tech	1928	2023	TEX 54–18	TEX 20–7	TEX 26–10	Chancellor's Spurs
West Virginia	1956	2022	tied 6–6	TEX 6–5	–	

== Individual accomplishments ==
=== Retired numbers ===
Texas Longhorns retired numbers
No.	Player	Pos.	Tenure	Ref.
10	Vince Young	QB	2003–2005	
12	Colt McCoy	QB	2006–2009	
20	Earl Campbell	RB	1974–1977	
22	Bobby Layne	QB/K	1944–1947	
34	Ricky Williams	RB	1995–1998	
60	Tommy Nobis	LB	1963–1965	

=== National awards and honors ===
The University of Texas has had 129 Longhorns selected to the College Football All-America Team including 62 Consensus and 25 Unanimous; Texas also has 17 players and coaches that have been inducted into the College Football Hall of Fame.

Major honors

- Heisman Trophy
  Most Outstanding Player

Earl Campbell – 1977
Ricky Williams – 1998

- Maxwell Award
  Best Football Player

Tommy Nobis – 1965
Ricky Williams – 1998
Vince Young – 2005
Colt McCoy – 2009

- Walter Camp Award
  Player of the Year

Ricky Williams – 1998
Colt McCoy – 2008, 2009

- Chic Harley Award
  College Football Player of the Year

Earl Campbell – 1977
Ricky Williams – 1998
Colt McCoy – 2009

- Archie Griffin Award
  Most Valuable Player

Vince Young – 2005
Colt McCoy – 2009

- AT&T ESPN All-America Player
  Fans Most Valuable Player

Cedric Benson – 2004
Vince Young – 2005
Colt McCoy – 2009

- AP Player of the Year
  Most Outstanding Player

Ricky Williams – 1998

- SN Player of the Year
  Top Collegiate Football Player

Earl Campbell – 1977
Ricky Williams – 1998
Colt McCoy – 2009

- UPI Player of the Year
  NCAA Coaches Player of the Year

Earl Campbell – 1977

- Freshman of the Year
  Top Quarterback

Colt McCoy – 2006

- Shaun Alexander Freshman of the Year
  Top Freshman

Colin Simmons – 2024

Offensive honors

- Doak Walker Award
  Best Running Back

Ricky Williams – 1997, 1998
Cedric Benson – 2004
D'Onta Foreman – 2016
Bijan Robinson – 2022

- Jim Brown Trophy
  Top Running Back

Ricky Williams – 1997, 1998

- Paul Warfield Trophy
  Top Wide Receiver

Jordan Shipley – 2009

- Davey O'Brien Award
  Best Quarterback

Vince Young – 2005
Colt McCoy – 2009

- Johnny Unitas Golden Arm Award
  Outstanding Senior Quarterback

Colt McCoy – 2009

- Manning Award
  Best Quarterback

Vince Young – 2005
Colt McCoy – 2009

- Quarterback of the Year
  Top Quarterback

Colt McCoy – 2009

Coaching Honors

- AFCA Award
  Coach of the Year

Darrell Royal – 1963, 1970

- Eddie Robinson Award
  Coach of the Year

Darrell Royal – 1961, 1963

- SN National Coach of the Year
  Coach of the Year

Darrell Royal – 1963, 1969

- Paul "Bear" Bryant Award
  Coach of the Year

Mack Brown – 2005

- Bobby Dodd Award
  Coach of the Year

Mack Brown – 2008

- Broyles Award
  Best Assistant Coach

Greg Davis – 2005

- AFCA Award
  Assistant Coach of the Year

Mac McWhorter – 2008

Defensive honors

- Lombardi Award
  Best Defensive Player

Kenneth Sims – 1981
Tony Degrate – 1984
Brian Orakpo – 2008
Kelvin Banks Jr. – 2024

- Nagurski Trophy
  Top Defensive Player

Derrick Johnson – 2004
Brian Orakpo – 2008

- Outland Trophy
  Top Interior Lineman

Scott Appleton – 1963
Tommy Nobis – 1965
Brad Shearer – 1977
T'Vondre Sweat – 2023
Kelvin Banks Jr. – 2024

- Dick Butkus Award
  Best Linebacker

Derrick Johnson – 2004

- Jack Lambert Trophy
  Top Linebacker

Derrick Johnson – 2004

- Jim Thorpe Award
  Top Defensive Back

Michael Huff – 2005
Aaron Ross – 2006
Jahdae Barron – 2024

- Ted Hendricks Award
  Top Defensive End

Brian Orakpo – 2008
Jackson Jeffcoat – 2013

- Ray Guy Award
  Top Punter

Michael Dickson – 2017

- Bill Willis Trophy
  Top Defensive Lineman

Brian Orakpo – 2008

- UPI Lineman of the Year
  Lineman of the Year

Scott Appleton – 1963
Kenneth Sims – 1981

Other honors

- Draddy Trophy (Academic Heisman)
  Best On and Off Field Performance

Dallas Griffin – 2007
Sam Acho – 2010

- Nils V. "Swede" Nelson Award
  Best Sportsmanship

Pat Culpepper – 1962

- Wuerffel Trophy
  Athletics, Academics, & Community Service

Sam Acho – 2010

- Today's Top VIII Award
  Outstanding Senior Student-Athletes

Kenneth Sims – 1982

- Amos Alonzo Stagg Award
  Outstanding Service for College Football

Dana X. Bible – 1954
(Head Coach and Athletic Director)
Darrell Royal – 2010
(Head Coach and Athletic Director)

- Disney Spirit Award
  College Football's Most Inspirational Figure

Nate Boyer – 2012

=== Conference awards ===
As of 2016, the Texas Longhorns have had 570 All-Conference Player selections since 1915, including 292 in the Southwest Conference and 278 in the Big 12 where Longhorn players have been named 78 times to the first team and 65 to the second team.

==== SEC ====
- Jacobs Blocking Trophy

Kelvin Banks Jr., OL, 2024

==== Big 12 ====
- Big 12 Offensive Player of the Year

Ricky Williams, RB, 1997 & 1998
Major Applewhite, QB, 1999
Vince Young, QB, 2005
Colt McCoy, QB, 2009

- Big 12 Offensive Freshman of the Year

Major Applewhite, QB, 1998
Roy Williams, WR, 2000
Cedric Benson, RB, 2001
Vince Young, QB, 2003
Jamaal Charles, RB, 2005
Colt McCoy, QB, 2006
Xavier Worthy, WR, 2021

- Big 12 Offensive Newcomer of the Year

Adonai Mitchell, WR, 2023

- Big 12 Offensive Lineman of the Year

Justin Blalock, 2006

- Big 12 Defensive Lineman of the Year

Brian Orakpo, DL, 2008
Poona Ford, DL, 2017
Charles Omenihu, DL, 2018
Byron Murphy II, DL, 2023

- Big 12 Defensive Player of the Year

Casey Hampton, DL, 2000
Derrick Johnson, LB, 2004
Aaron Ross, DB, 2006
Brian Orakpo, DL, 2008
Jackson Jeffcoat, DE, 2013
Malik Jefferson, LB, 2017
T'Vondre Sweat, DL, 2023

- Big 12 Defensive Freshman of the Year

Cory Redding, DL, 1999
Derrick Johnson, LB, 2001
Rodrique Wright, DL, 2002
Brian Orakpo, DL, 2005
Quandre Diggs, DB, 2011
Malik Jefferson, LB, 2015
Caden Sterns, DB, 2018
Anthony Hill Jr., LB, 2023

- Big 12 Special Teams Player of the Year

Michael Dickson, P, 2016 & 2017

- Big 12 Coach of the Year

Mack Brown, 2005 & 2009

=== Longhorns in the NFL ===
387 Longhorns have been drafted into the NFL, including 44 in the 1st round.
As of September 4, 2026, the Longhorns have 53 players active on NFL rosters.

- Kelvin Banks Jr., OT, New Orleans Saints
- Jahdae Barron, CB, Denver Broncos
- Andrew Beck, TE/FB, New York Jets
- Jaydon Blue, RB, Philadelphia Eagles
- Isaiah Bond, WR, Cleveland Browns
- Jack Bouwmeester, P, Los Angeles Rams
- Jonathon Brooks, RB, Carolina Panthers
- Vernon Broughton, DT, New Orleans Saints
- Ethan Burke, DL, Baltimore Ravens
- Matthew Caldwell, QB, Los Angeles Rams
- DJ Campbell, OL, Miami Dolphins
- Alfred Collins, DT, San Francisco 49ers
- Hayden Conner, OG/OC, Arizona Cardinals
- Sam Cosmi, OG, Washington Commanders
- Cameron Dicker, K, Los Angeles Chargers
- Michael Dickson, PT, Seattle Seahawks
- Devin Duvernay, WR, Arizona Cardinals
- Sam Ehlinger, QB, Denver Broncos
- DeShon Elliott, FS, Pittsburgh Steelers
- Jack Endries, TE, Cincinnati Bengals
- Quinn Ewers, QB, Jacksonville Jaguars
- Jaylan Ford, LB, New Orleans Saints
- Poona Ford, DT, Los Angeles Rams
- Matthew Golden, WR, Green Bay Packers
- Gunnar Helm, TE, Tennessee Titans
- Anthony Hill Jr., LB, Tennessee Titans
- Lil'Jordan Humphrey, WR, Denver Broncos
- D'Shawn Jamison, CB, Arizona Cardinals
- Roschon Johnson, RB, Chicago Bears
- Brandon Jones, FS, Denver Broncos
- Christian Jones, OT, Chicago Bears
- P. J. Locke, SS, Dallas Cowboys
- Jake Majors, OG/OC, Philadelphia Eagles
- Adonai Mitchell, WR, New York Jets
- Trey Moore, LB, Miami Dolphins
- Malik Muhammad, CB, Chicago Bears
- Andrew Mukuba, S, Philadelphia Eagles
- Byron Murphy II, DT, Seattle Seahawks
- Bill Norton, DT, Los Angeles Rams
- Moro Ojomo, DT, Philadelphia Eagles
- Charles Omenihu, DE, Washington Commanders
- Joseph Ossai, LB, New York Jets
- DeMarvion Overshown, LB, Dallas Cowboys
- Malcolm Roach, DT, Denver Broncos
- Bijan Robinson, RB, Atlanta Falcons
- Ja'Tavion Sanders, TE, Carolina Panthers
- Brenden Schooler, S, New England Patriots
- Barryn Sorrell, DE, Green Bay Packers
- T'Vondre Sweat, DT, New York Jets
- Michael Taaffe, DB, Miami Dolphins
- Jordan Whittington, WR, Los Angeles Rams
- Cameron Williams, OT, Atlanta Falcons
- Xavier Worthy, WR, Kansas City Chiefs

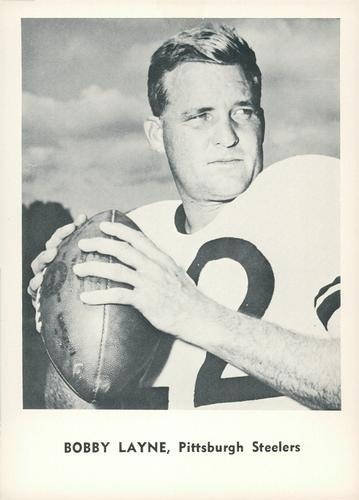
QB Bobby Layne was inducted in the Pro Football HOF

=== College Football Hall of Fame inductees ===
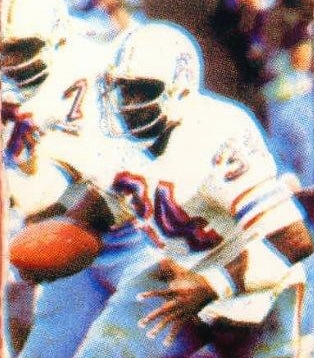
Earl Campbell, 1977 Heisman Trophy winner

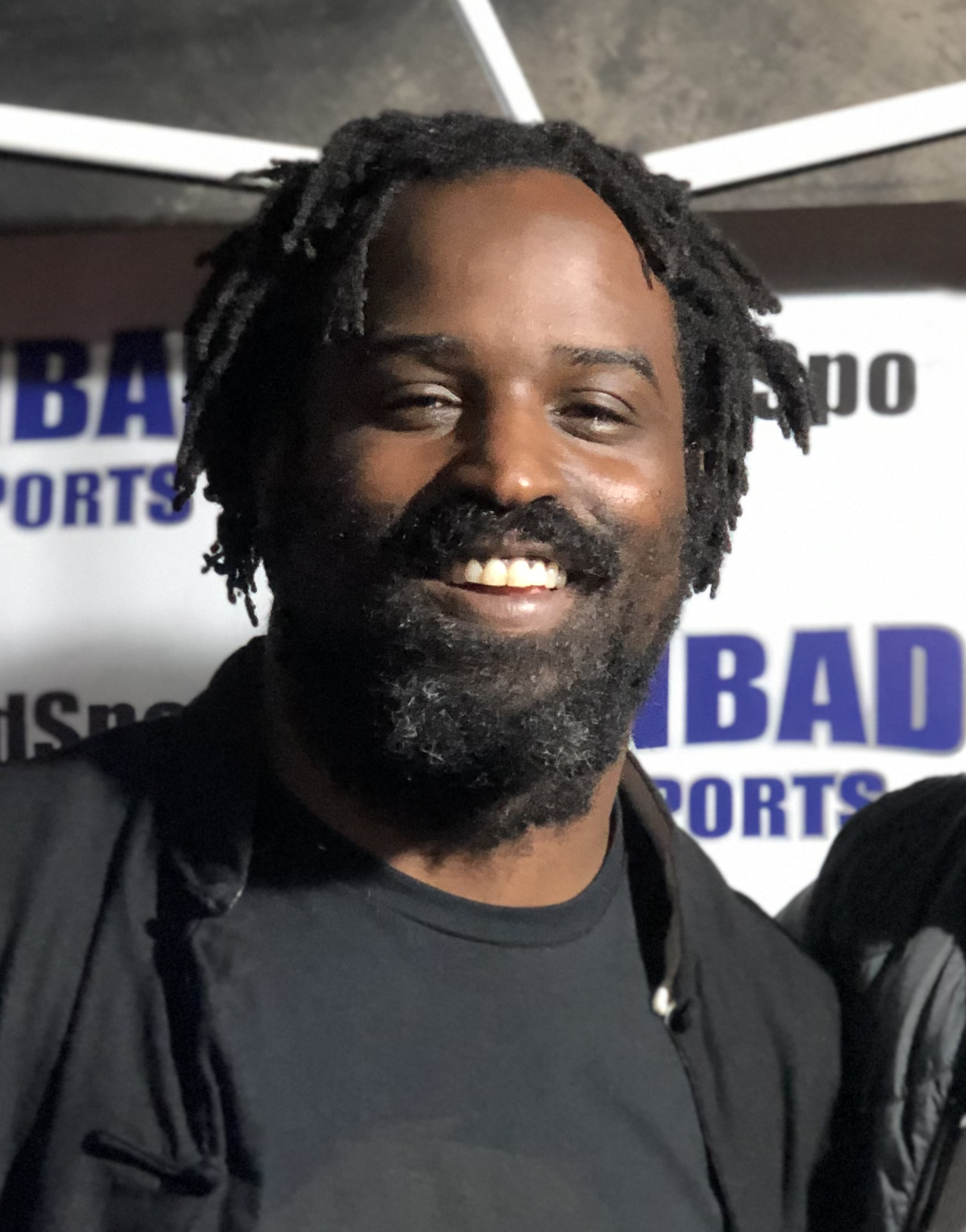
Ricky Williams, 1998 Heisman Trophy winner

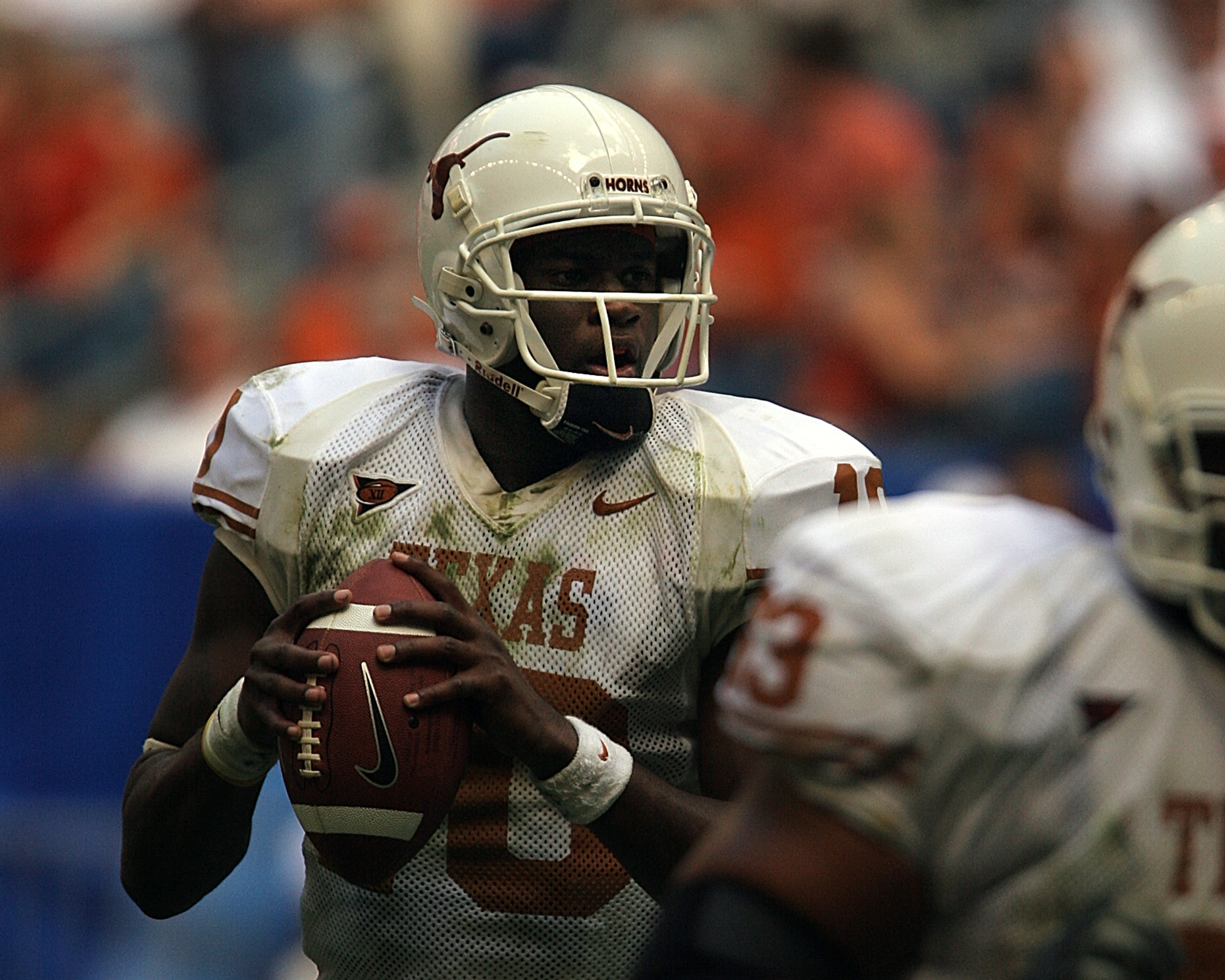
Vince Young, 2005 BCS National Championship Game Offensive MVP

Texas has had 22 players and three former coaches inducted into the Hall of Fame.

Name	Time at Texas	Position	Inducted
Bud Sprague	1923–1924	T	1970
Harrison Stafford	1930–1932	RB	1975
Dana X. Bible	1937–1946	Head coach	1951
Malcolm Kutner	1939–1941	End	1974
Hub Bechtol	1944–1946	End	1991
Bobby Layne	1944–1947	QB	1968
Bud McFadin	1948–1950	G	1983
Harley Sewell	1950–1952	G	2000
Darrell Royal	1957–1976	Head coach	1983
James Saxton	1959–1961	RB	1996
Tommy Nobis	1963–1965	LB	1981
Chris Gilbert	1966–1968	RB	1999
Bob McKay	1968–1969	OL	2017
Jerry Sisemore	1970–1972	OL	2002
Roosevelt Leaks	1972–1974	RB	2005
Doug English	1972–1974	DT	2011
Earl Campbell	1974–1977	RB	1990
Johnnie Johnson	1976–1979	DB	2007
Steve McMichael	1976–1979	DT	2009
Kenneth Sims	1978–1981	DT	2021
Jerry Gray	1981–1984	DB	2013
Ricky Williams	1995–1998	RB	2015
Mack Brown	1998–2013	Head coach	2018
Vince Young	2003–2005	QB	2019
Derrick Johnson	2001–2004	LB	2023

=== Pro Football Hall of Fame inductees ===
Texas has had 5 players inducted into the NFL Hall of Fame. One former Longhorn was inducted as an NFL head coach.

Name	Time at Texas	Position	Inducted
Bobby Layne	1944–1947	QB	1967
Tom Landry	1947–1948	S/P	1990
Earl Campbell	1974–1977	RB	1991
Bobby Dillon	1949–1951	DB	2020
Steve McMichael	1976–1979	DT	2024

== Uniforms ==
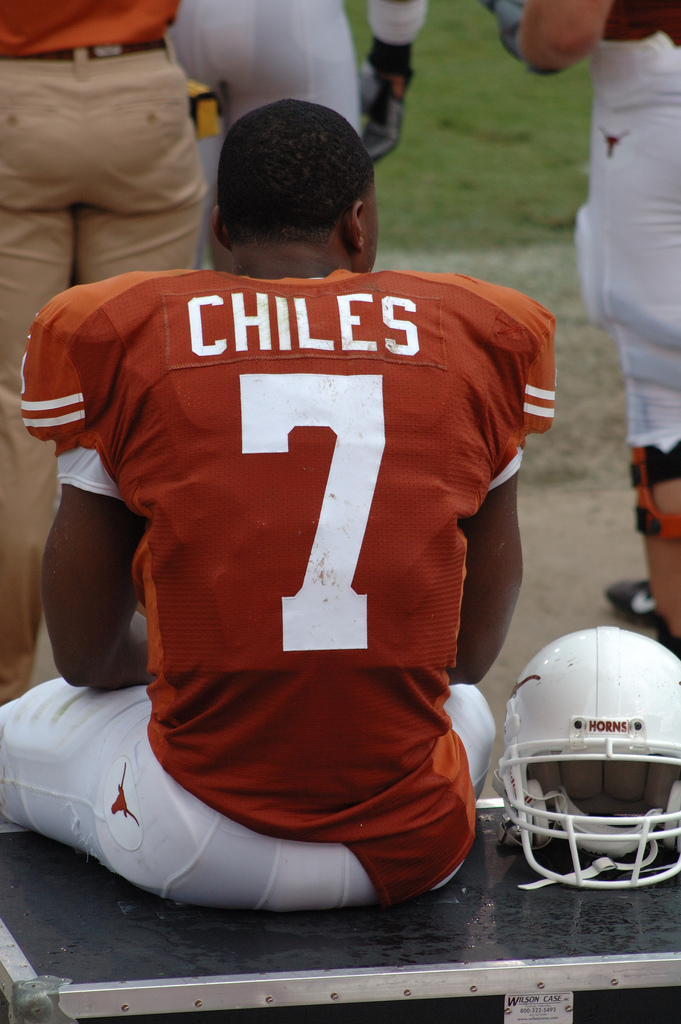
Texas' home uniform (2007)

=== Colors ===
The 1893 team did not always wear orange. They also wore gold and white uniforms. In 1895, the Texas Athletic Association moved to orange and white colors. In 1897, the Association moved to orange and maroon to save cleaning costs. The Cactus Yearbook at the time listed the university colors as either gold or orange and white until the 1899 Cactus declared the university colors to be gold and maroon. Students at the university's medical branch in Galveston (UTMB) were in favor of royal blue. By 1899, a UT fan could have worn any of yellow, orange, white, red, maroon, or even blue.

The Board of Regents held an election in that year to decide the team colors. Students, faculty, staff and alumni were asked to vote. 1,111 votes were cast, with 562 in favor of orange and white. Orange and maroon received 310, royal blue 203, crimson 10, and royal blue and crimson 11. For the next 30 years, Longhorn teams wore bright orange on their uniforms, which faded to yellow by the end of the season. By the 1920s, other teams sometimes called the Longhorn squads "yellow bellies," a term that didn't sit well with the athletic department. In 1928, UT football coach Clyde Littlefield ordered uniforms in a darker shade of orange that wouldn't fade, which would later become known as "burnt orange" or "Texas orange." The dark-orange color was used until the dye became too expensive during the Great Depression, and the uniforms reverted to the bright orange for another two decades, until coach Darrell K Royal revived the burnt-orange color in the early 1960s.

For the 2009 Lone Star Showdown, the Longhorns wore a Nike Pro Combat uniform.

=== Helmets ===
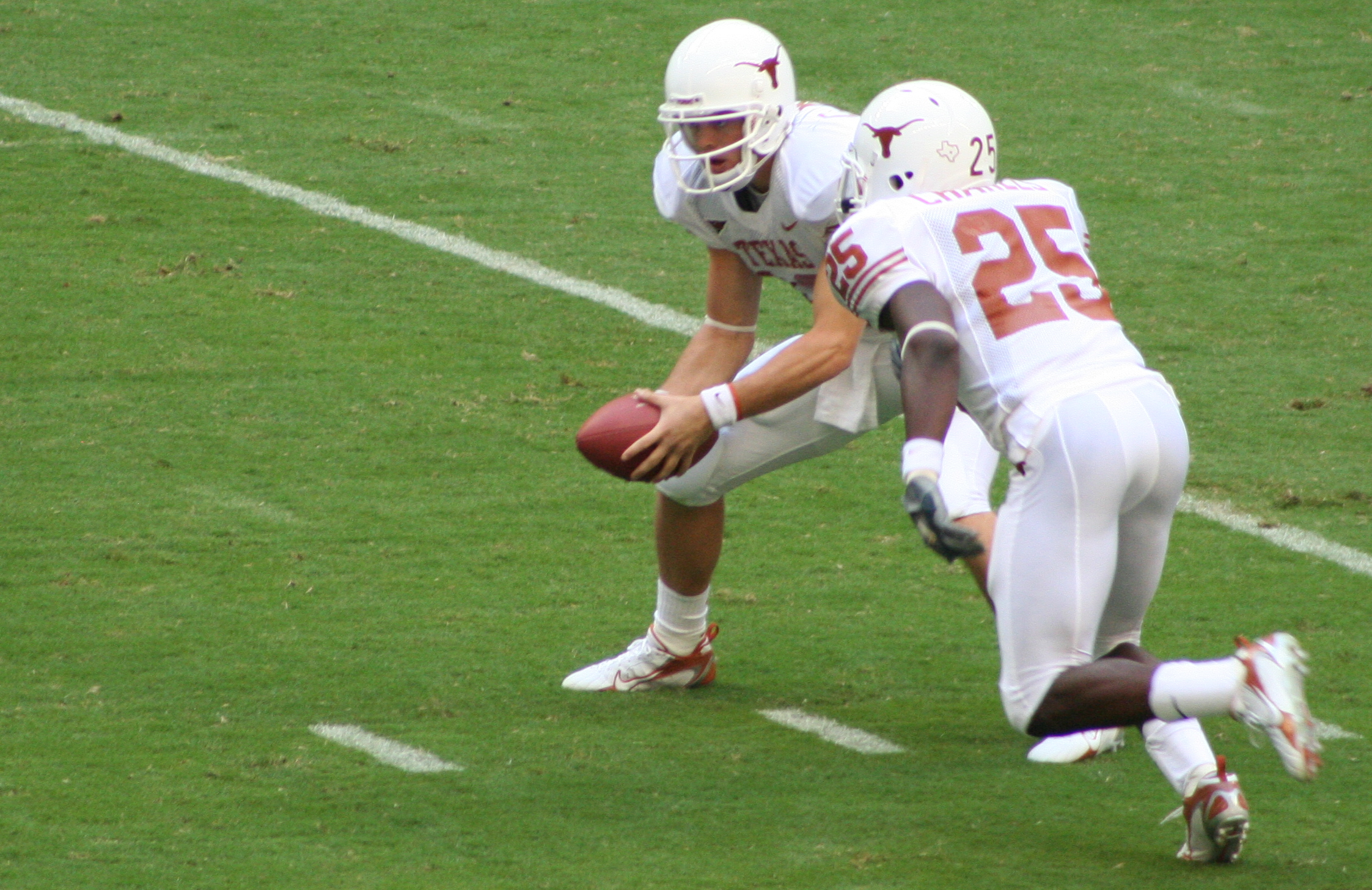
Colt McCoy hands the ball to Jamaal Charles.

From 1961 to 1962, the Longhorns' helmets featured the individual player's number on the side in burnt orange above the "Bevo" logo, which was also in burnt orange, with a large burnt-orange stripe down the middle of the helmet. The burnt-orange stripe was removed in 1963 and the helmet featured only the burnt-orange Bevo logo below the player's number, which was also in burnt orange. In 1967, the team abandoned the individual player's number above the logo, and moved the burnt-orange Bevo logo to the center of the helmet's side. With the exception of the 1969 season, this remained the team's helmet design until 1977. In 1969, the helmet design commemorated the 100th anniversary of the first college football game. The player's number was replaced by a large burnt-orange football above the Bevo logo. Inside the football was a white number "100" that indicated the anniversary year.

== Traditions ==
The University of Texas is a tradition-rich school, and many of those traditions are associated with athletics events, especially football. Some Longhorn traditions include:

- Bevo – the school mascot, a live Texas longhorn steer present for football games and other special events. It is a common misconception that the mascot's name came from Texas students altering a 13-0 branding a group of Aggies gave the steer. In actuality, Bevo received his name several months before the Aggies could vandalize the steer in a Texas alumni magazine. His name came from the slang term for a steer that is destined to become food, beeve, and in a common practice for the 00's and 10's, an "O" was added at the end, similar to Groucho or Harpo Marx.
- Big Bertha – Is the largest bass drum in the world. On October 15, 2022, Big Bertha II was introduced. At just over 9.5 feet in diameter and 55 inches in depth, it is currently the world's largest drum.
- "The Eyes of Texas" – the school song, traditionally led by the Orange Jackets on the football field, sung to the tune of I've Been Working on the Railroad
- Hook 'em Horns – the school hand signal, was introduced at a pep rally in 1955. Sports Illustrated featured the Hook 'em Horns symbol in front of a Texas pennant on the cover of their September 10, 1973 issue (pictured).
- "Texas Fight" – the school fight song
- Smokey the Cannon – fired in celebration on game day at the moment of kickoff and after Texas scores
- The University of Texas Longhorn Band - nicknamed The Showband of the Southwest
- The World's Largest Texas Flag is run on the field prior to home football games, bowl games, and other sporting events. It is also dropped from the President's Balcony during pep rallies. It is owned by the UT Alpha Rho chapter of Alpha Phi Omega.
- Lighting the Tower (also known as the Main Building) in orange for various types of sporting victories. After National Championship victories, windows are lighted in the main building to display a large number "1".

== Future opponents ==
=== SEC Conference opponents ===
On September 23, 2025, the SEC released their Conference slate for the 2026-2029 Seasons

Location	2026	2027	2028	2029
Home	Arkansas	Texas A&M	Arkansas	Texas A&M
Home	Florida	Auburn	LSU	Alabama
Home	Mississippi State	Georgia	Missouri	South Carolina
Home	Ole Miss	Kentucky	Tennessee	Vanderbilt
Neutral	Oklahoma	Oklahoma	Oklahoma	Oklahoma
Away	Texas A&M	Arkansas	Texas A&M	Arkansas
Away	LSU	Alabama	Florida	Auburn
Away	Missouri	South Carolina	Mississippi State	Georgia
Away	Tennessee	Vanderbilt	Ole Miss	Kentucky

=== Non-conference opponents ===
Announced schedules as of May 13, 2025. As part of the agreement allowing Texas and Oklahoma to move from the Big 12 to the SEC in 2024, instead of 2025, the sites of the home-and-home series with Michigan, originally scheduled to be at Texas in 2024, and at Michigan in 2027, were reversed, giving Fox the right to broadcast the 2024 game at Michigan.

2027	2028	2029	2030	2031
New Mexico State	Louisiana Tech	Louisiana–Monroe		
Michigan	at Notre Dame	UTEP		
UTEP	UTSA	Notre Dame	UTSA	UTEP

== Recruiting department ==
Texas Football's recruiting department is led by Billy Glasscock. Glasscock came from NC State in 2021 as director of player personnel, leading a team of staffers and interns in a combination of duties between recruiting and player personnel. On the recruiting side, Taylor Searels directs everything from an events standpoint to accommodate recruiting visits. In player personnel, JM Jones and Austin Shelton are assistant directors of player personnel, handling offense and defense respectively.
