= 1969 Texas vs. Arkansas football game =

1969 Texas vs. Arkansas
- Conference game National Championship Game (Note: Through luck and fortuitous scheduling, a "national championship game" was occasionally able to settle the matter on the field, as described in some contemporaneous reports. Despite the promotional billing, in several instances there were plausible scenarios for a third team to be selected as national champion by the major selectors, depending on outcomes of other games.) (Note: This was the final regular season game, and it determined the Coaches Poll title. Entering the game, Arkansas ranked No. 3 in the Coaches Poll and remained No. 3.) "Game of the Century"
Texas Longhorns	Arkansas Razorbacks
(9–0)	(9–0)
15	14
Head coach: Darrell Royal	Head coach: Frank Broyles
AP / Coaches; 1 / 1	AP / Coaches; 2 / 3
	1	2	3	4	Total
Texas	0	0	0	15	15
Arkansas	7	0	7	0	14
- Date: December 6, 1969
- Season: 1969
- Stadium: Razorback Stadium
- Location: Fayetteville, Arkansas
- Referee: Carl Landiss
- Attendance: 47,500

United States TV coverage
- Network: ABC
- Announcers: Chris Schenkel and Bud Wilkinson
- Nielsen ratings: 52.1

The 1969 Texas vs. Arkansas football game, sometimes referred to as the "Game of the Century", was a college football game played on December 6 in which No. 1 Texas visited No. 2 Arkansas at Razorback Stadium in Fayetteville, Arkansas. The Longhorns came back from a 14–0 deficit after three quarters to win 15–14.

President Richard Nixon attended the game and established it as a national championship game by announcing he would award the winning team a presidential plaque declaring them "the number-one college football team in college football's one-hundredth year."

With a Nielsen rating of 52.1 (a 74 share), this was and remains as of 2023, the highest TV rating in American football history, college or professional.

== Buildup ==
The relative parity which had existed within the Southwest Conference ended with the arrival of Darrell Royal and Frank Broyles at their respective schools, with either Texas or Arkansas winning or sharing the SWC crown eight out of the ten years leading up to the game (the exceptions were 1966 and 1967, when SMU and Texas A&M, respectively, won the titles). Both Texas and Arkansas had won one national championship in the 1960s, and the schools developed a rivalry after Arkansas defeated in consecutive years top-ranked Texas teams in 1964 and 1965. In 1968 Texas, which tied its first game vs. Houston and lost its second to Texas Tech, handed Arkansas their only loss of the year.

The 1969 season marked the centennial of college football, and this game decided the Southwest Conference championship and its berth in the Cotton Bowl. ABC television executive Beano Cook had arranged for Texas and Arkansas to play the final game of the regular season, moving their usual October date to the first weekend in December. ABC Sports executive Roone Arledge persuaded Arkansas coach Frank Broyles to move the game with a promise that President Richard Nixon would attend, and ABC would televise Arkansas' season opener in 1970 against Stanford (and its star quarterback, Jim Plunkett). Broyles even talked Arkansas officials into installing AstroTurf at Razorback Stadium. Kick off was scheduled for 12:20 p.m. CST, because the stadium in Fayetteville did not have lights at the time. There were early discussions of moving the game to an evening start at War Memorial Stadium in Little Rock, where Arkansas played two or three home games per season, but ABC did not consider the lights at Little Rock to be sufficient (the practice of renting portable light standards for late afternoon and evening kickoffs did not begin until the 1980s).

For a long while, it looked as though the game would be a meeting of national title also-rans. Ohio State was dominating the Big Ten and the chances of the game having an impact on the national championship appeared remote. However, as the Longhorns took a Saturday off to prepare for their upcoming game on Thanksgiving Day with Texas A&M, Michigan and its upstart coach Bo Schembechler upset the Buckeyes 24–12 in Ann Arbor. Texas and Arkansas moved up to the top of the polls, and the move to December made the game the focus of the entire American sporting public, gaining a television rating of a 52.1 share, meaning more than half the TV sets in use in the country were tuned to this game.

Game day took on an eerie feeling. Evangelist Billy Graham attended to give the pregame prayer. The night before, a steady, cold rain fell in Fayetteville and an icy fog hovered over the stadium as the crowd awaited the arrival of President Nixon, who would award a plaque symbolic of the National Championship to the winner. Due to the lack of a suitable airport in northwest Arkansas to land Air Force One (Fayetteville's Drake Field was far too small, and Northwest Arkansas Regional Airport did not open until 1998), Air Force One landed at Fort Smith Regional Airport, and Marine One flew from Fort Smith to Fayetteville and landed on the practice fields just east of Razorback Stadium shortly after kickoff.

== The teams ==
In the 100th year of college football, it truly was the "Game of the Century." In a game between unbeatens played at Arkansas' Razorback Stadium in Fayetteville, the Longhorns were ranked Number 1 in the country, having won 18 straight games. The Arkansas Razorbacks were ranked Number 2, having won 15 straight since their last loss to Texas in Austin a year ago. The Texas wishbone attack, then still a novelty, was an offensive juggernaut that averaged over 44 points per game coming into the contest. Arkansas led the nation in scoring defense, yielding only 6.8 points per game. In addition, both the Razorback pro-style passing offense and the Texas defense were ranked in the top ten nationally.

== The game ==
=== Summary ===
Arkansas scored touchdowns after Texas fumbled on its first possession of each half to take a 14–0 lead. However, the Longhorns overcame this deficit with two fourth-quarter touchdowns, which included a successful two-point conversion after the first and a memorable fourth-down conversion to set up the second. Despite having turned the ball over six times, Texas won 15–14.

=== Key plays & scoring ===
The Longhorns got off to a sloppy start, losing a fumble on the second play from scrimmage and throwing an interception on their first passing attempt of the game, which came during their second possession.

A 1-yard leap into the end zone by Bill Burnett for an opening-drive touchdown and a 29-yard touchdown reception by Chuck Dicus in the third quarter put the Hogs up 14–0 with 9:06 to play in the third quarter.

Texas quarterback James Street scrambled for a touchdown on the first play of the fourth quarter. Longhorns coach Darrell Royal had decided before the game to go for two after the Longhorns' first touchdown to avoid a tie, and Street dove into the end zone to make it 14–8. This was an unusual decision since most teams would have delayed the decision for a two-point conversion until the next touchdown (though clearly mathematically correct, since this would have given the Longhorns a later chance to tie in case of a failed two-point try).

Arkansas quarterback Bill Montgomery next led the Razorbacks on a 73-yard drive down to the Texas 7. On third down, Montgomery was intercepted in the end zone by Danny Lester, Arkansas' first turnover of the game. A field goal would have likely put the game out of reach for Texas.

Arkansas would get the ball back, though, as Texas lost a fumble for its sixth and final turnover of the game on the Arkansas 42. However, Arkansas would be forced to punt the ball back to Texas after only three plays.

Still down 14–8, Texas began a desperate drive for the end zone that appeared to stall with 4:47 left, when Royal opted for yet another gamble on fourth-and-3 from their own 43-yard line. During a timeout that Texas took before the fateful play, Royal shouted at Street, "Right 53 Veer Pass". The play was a deep pattern throw to the tight end. The play wasn't in the Texas game plan package. "Are you sure that's the call you want?" Street said. "Damn right I'm sure!" Royal snapped. Street had noticed Arkansas defenders looking into the Texas huddle, so he fixed his gaze on split end Cotton Speyrer while explaining the play to Randy Peschel, saying "Randy, I'm looking and pointing at Cotton, but I'm talking to you." Street then hit Peschel on the dramatic play, with Peschel making a difficult catch over his shoulder in double coverage. It gained 43 yards, putting Texas on the Razorbacks' 13.

Two plays later Jim Bertelsen ran in for the game-tying touchdown. Donnie Wigginton, the third-string quarterback who was the holder, made a big save on a high snap and Happy Feller booted the extra point for the winning score of 15–14 with 3:58 left.

Arkansas made a push into Texas territory, hoping for a field goal from All-American kicker Bill McClard. Arkansas was down to the Texas 40 when Tom Campbell, son of Longhorns defensive coordinator Mike Campbell, intercepted Montgomery on the Texas 21-yard line with less than a minute left.

== Controversy ==
As noted above, President Richard Nixon attended the game along with several members of his staff and U.S. Representatives George H. W. Bush of Texas and John Paul Hammerschmidt of Arkansas, having announced that he would give a plaque to the winner, proclaiming it to be the National Champion – to the chagrin of observers who thought it premature to do so before the New Year's Day bowl games, and of fans of Penn State, which would also end the season undefeated and untied. Arkansas took a 14–0 lead and held it into the fourth quarter, but Texas came from behind to win 15–14 and accepted Nixon's plaque.

Texas beat Notre Dame 21–17 in the Cotton Bowl Classic, and removed any doubt as to whether it deserved consideration as National Champion, although Penn State fans still insist that their team, also undefeated and winner of the Orange Bowl, was better. The Cotton Bowl Classic first invited Penn State to play the Southwest Conference champions. The Nittany Lions declined the invitation and went to Miami, where they defeated Big Eight champion Missouri. This decision was made while Ohio State was still ranked #1 with only one game to play, so at the time, it did not appear that a national title was likely to be at stake. The 1969 Texas–Penn State conflict, never settled on the field, has been one of the major arguments in favor of what eventually became, four and a half decades later, the Division I-A playoff. Arkansas lost the 1970 Sugar Bowl to Ole Miss, led by Archie Manning. The entire Texas-Penn State debate and Nixon's involvement led to a quote from Penn State coach Joe Paterno, a conservative Republican, during a commencement speech at Penn State in 1973 about Nixon, "I've wondered how President Nixon could know so little about Watergate in 1973 and so much about college football in 1969."

== Legacy ==
This game has been nicknamed "Dixie's Last Stand", since it was the last major American sporting event played between two all-white teams. However, major college football was not completely integrated until 1972 when the final holdouts, Brigham Young, LSU and Ole Miss, fielded their first black varsity members.

With the Vietnam War still raging and Nixon in attendance, protesters came to the game, and one of them climbed up a tree overlooking the stadium and held up an antiwar sign. An urban legend grew up around this game, claiming that this protester was Arkansas native and future President Bill Clinton. Clinton, however, was not at the game, as he was then a Rhodes Scholar at the University of Oxford in England, and was listening to the game on a shortwave radio with some American friends.

The 1970 Arkansas-Texas game in Austin was moved from its usual October date to the first Saturday in December by ABC. The Longhorns entered ranked No. 1 in both the AP and UPI coaches polls and carried a 29-game winning streak, while the Razorbacks came in No. 4 in both polls, riding a nine-game winning streak after losing their season opener to Stanford at Little Rock. This time there was no drama, as Texas won in a 42-7 rout to wrap up the UPI national championship (the UPI coaches poll did not conduct a post-bowl poll until 1974). Arkansas did not play in a bowl game, thanks to LSU routing Ole Miss 61-17 later that night to clinch the Southeastern Conference championship and a berth in the Orange Bowl opposite Big Eight Conference champion Nebraska. Texas lost 24-11 to Notre Dame in the Cotton Bowl, ending its 30-game winning streak and allowing Nebraska to win the AP national championship with a 17-12 Orange Bowl win vs. LSU.

The two coaches in this game, Darrell Royal of Texas and Frank Broyles of Arkansas, both retired after the 1976 season. Royal became athletic director of the entire Texas athletic program, while Broyles continued on as the athletic director for the Arkansas men's program, a position he began in 1974 (Arkansas had a separate women's athletic department from 1971 through 2007). In addition to being athletic director, Broyles also went on to become the lead color analyst for college football on ABC, working alongside Keith Jackson from 1977 until 1985.

Royal retired from his AD job in 1980, but Broyles continued on through 2007, with the men's and women's athletic programs merging immediately after his retirement. Broyles spearheaded Arkansas' move from the SWC to the SEC in 1991, and was later instrumental in setting up a two-year series between the Razorbacks and Longhorns in 2003 (at Austin) won by Arkansas and 2004 (at Fayetteville) won by Texas. Their last postseason meeting was December 29, 2014, in the Texas Bowl in Houston, won by Arkansas 31–7. They met again during the regular season in 2021 in Fayetteville, with Arkansas prevailing 40-21. Texas leads the series 56–23.

Royal died in 2012 and Broyles in 2017.

In a 2017 episode of Nathan For You, “Finding Frances,” Bill Gates impersonator and Arkansas Razorbacks fan Bill Heath undergoes hypnotherapy in an attempt to recall memories which might serve as clues in a search for his high school sweetheart. The only memory he can recall during the session, however, is the conclusion to the 1969 Texas-Arkansas football game. “It was a bad call,” Heath said. “[Arkansas] should have won the game.”

Arkansas and Texas were reunited in the SEC in 2024 when the Longhorns and Oklahoma moved over from the Big XII Conference. The Longhorns and Razorbacks were scheduled to play during the 2024 season in Fayetteville, and Texas won their reunion match 20-10 on November 16, 2024.

== Game summary ==
Texas Longhorns (9–0) vs. Arkansas Razorbacks (9–0)

Quarter	1	2	3	4	Total
No. 1 Texas	0	0	0	15	15
No. 2 Arkansas	7	0	7	0	14

at Razorback Stadium • Fayetteville, AR

- Date: Saturday, December 6, 1969
- Game time: 12:20 PM CST
- Game weather: Overcast with Rain, 38 °F (3 °C)
- Game attendance: 47,500
- Referee: Carl Landiss
- TV announcers (ABC): Chris Schenkel, Bud Wilkinson and Bill Flemming
- Box Score

Game information

First Quarter

- (13:33) ARK – Bill Burnett 1 yard run (McClard kick), ARK 7–0; 5 plays, 22 yards, 0:57

Third Quarter

- (9:06) ARK – Chuck Dicus 29 yard pass from Bill Montgomery (McClard kick), ARK 14–0; 5 plays, 53 yards, 1:38

Fourth Quarter

- (14:47) UT – James Street 42 yard run (Street run), ARK 14–8; 9 plays, 80 yards, 3:37
- (3:58) UT – Jim Bertelsen 2 yard run (Feller kick), UT 15–14; 6 plays, 64 yards, 2:12

Statistics	TEX	ARK
First downs	19	18
Total yards	368	308
Rushes/yards	60/244	44/103
Passing yards	124	205
Passing: Comp–Att–Int	6–10–2	14–22–2
Time of possession		

Team	Category	Player	Statistics
Texas	Passing	James Street	6–10, 124 yards, 2 INTs
Texas	Rushing	Steve Worster	25 car, 94 yards
Texas	Receiving	Cotton Speyrer	4 rec, 65 yards
Arkansas	Passing	Bill Montgomery	14–22, 205 yards, 1 TD, 2 INTs
Arkansas	Rushing	Bill Burnett	19 car, 82 yards, 1 TD
Arkansas	Receiving	Chuck Dicus	9 rec, 146 yards, 1 TD

== See also ==
- Arkansas–Texas football rivalry
