= 1971 Cotton Bowl Classic =

- 35th Cotton Bowl Classic
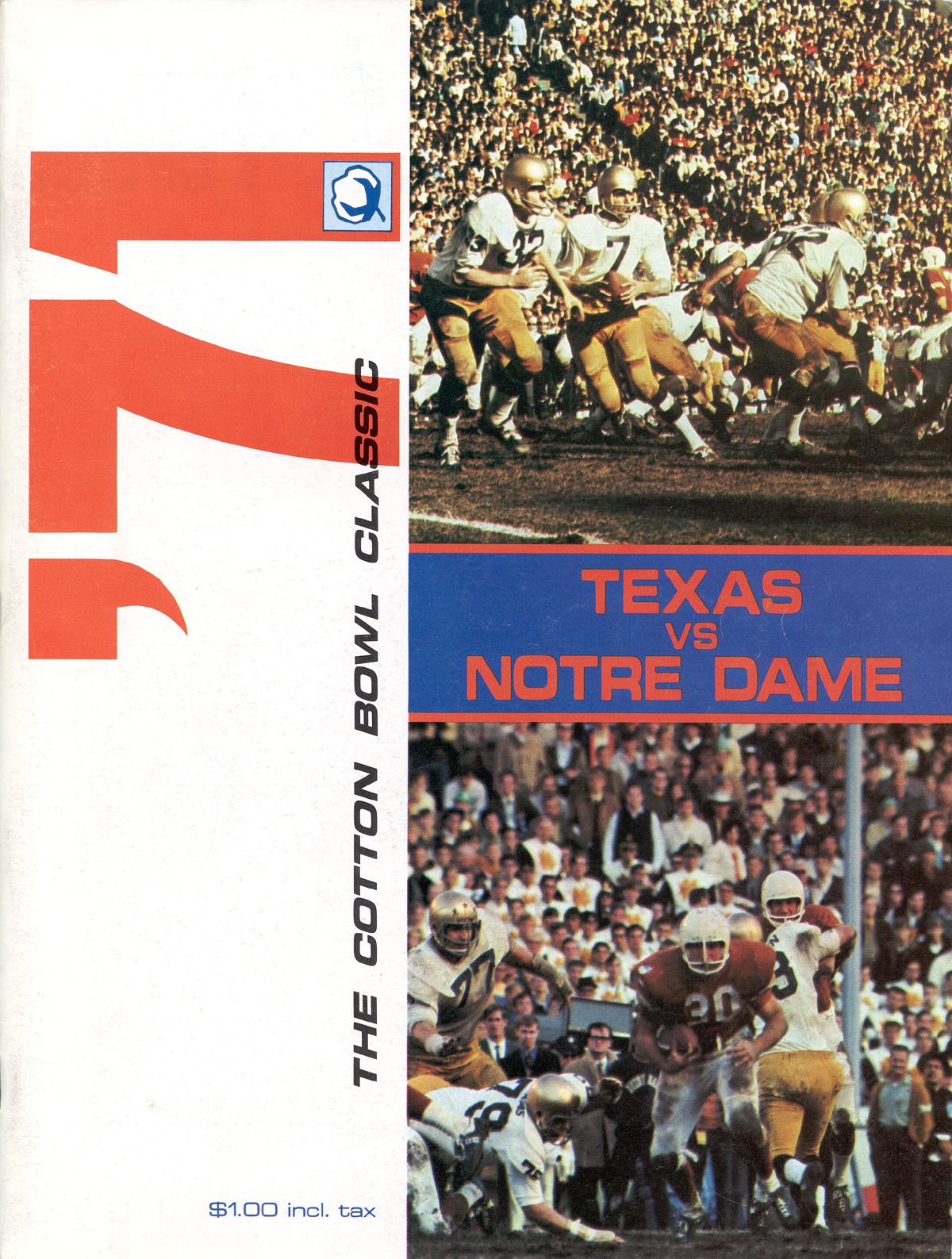
Notre Dame Fighting Irish	Texas Longhorns
(9–1)	(10–0)
Independent	SWC
24	11
Head coach: Ara Parseghian	Head coach: Darrell Royal
AP / Coaches; 6 / 5	AP / Coaches; 1 / 1
	1	2	3	4	Total
Notre Dame	14	10	0	0	24
Texas	3	8	0	0	11
- Date: January 1, 1971
- Season: 1970
- Stadium: Cotton Bowl
- Location: Dallas, Texas
- MVP: Steve Worster (Texas FB); Bob Olson (Notre Dame LB)
- Favorite: Texas by 7 points
- Referee: Gene Calhoun (Big Ten) (split crew: Big Ten, Southwest)
- Attendance: 72,000

United States TV coverage
- Network: CBS
- Announcers: Lindsey Nelson, Tom Brookshier

The Cotton Bowl in Dallas, Texas, hosted the Cotton Bowl Classic.

The 1971 Cotton Bowl Classic was the 35th edition of the college football bowl game, played at the Cotton Bowl in Dallas, Texas, on Friday, January 1. A rematch from the previous year, the undefeated and top-ranked Texas Longhorns of the Southwest Conference were upset by the independent Notre Dame Fighting Irish, 24–11.

== Teams ==
=== Notre Dame ===
Led by head coach Ara Parseghian, Notre Dame's captains were Larry DiNardo and Tim Kelly, and featured Joe Theismann at quarterback and Tom Gatewood as a wide receiver.

=== Texas ===
Texas was coached by Darrell Royal, and the captains for the Longhorns were Scott Henderson, Steve Worster, Bobby Wuensch and Bill Zapalac. The team also featured Jerry Sisemore at tackle and Jim Bertelsen at running back.

Texas was trying to win consecutive national championships, while Notre Dame was seeking revenge for the previous Cotton Bowl loss to Texas, its first bowl appearance in over four decades.

== Game summary ==
Notre Dame Fighting Irish (9–1) vs. Texas Longhorns (10–0)

Quarter	1	2	3	4	Total
No. 6 Notre Dame	14	10	0	0	24
No. 1 Texas	3	8	0	0	11

at Cotton Bowl • Dallas, TX

- Date: Friday, January 1, 1971
- Game time: 1:00 PM CDT
- Game weather: Clear, 52 °F (11 °C)
- Game attendance: 73,000
- TV announcers (CBS): Lindsey Nelson, Tom Brookshier
- Box Score

Game information

First Quarter

- (15:38) UT – Happy Feller 23 yard field goal, UT 3–0; 5 plays, 67 yards, 1:33
- (7:58) ND – Tom Gatewood 26 yard pass from Joe Theismann (Hempel kick), ND 7–3; 10 plays, 80 yards, 3:39
- (5:11) ND – Joe Theisman 3 yard run (Hempel kick), ND 14–3; 6 plays, 13 yards, 2:42

Second Quarter

- (13:28) ND – Joe Theisman 15 yard run (Hempel kick), ND 21–3; 5 plays, 53 yards, 1:37
- (1:52) UT – Jim Bertelsen 2 yard run (Lester pass from Phillips), ND 21–11; 18 plays, 84 yards, 7:02
- (0:24) ND – Scott Hempel 36 yard field goal, ND 24–11; 8 plays, 78 yards, 1:21

Statistics	ND	TEX
First downs	16	20
Total yards	359	426
Rushes/yards	52/146	55/216
Passing yards	213	240
Passing: Comp–Att–Int	10–19–1	10–27–1
Time of possession		

Team	Category	Player	Statistics
Notre Dame	Passing	Joe Theismann	9–16, 176 yards, 1 TD, 1 INT
Notre Dame	Rushing	Cieszkowski	13 car, 52 yards
Notre Dame	Receiving	Yoder	2 rec, 96 yards
Texas	Passing	Eddie Phillips	9–17, 199 yards
Texas	Rushing	Eddie Phillips	23 car, 164 yards
Texas	Receiving	Deryl Comer	4 rec, 67 yards

After Texas' initial field goal, Notre Dame scored 21 straight points. Texas scored in the second quarter and Notre Dame added a field goal to lead 24–11 at halftime. Parseghian's defense held the Longhorn wishbone offense in check the rest of the game and the second half was scoreless. Texas committed six turnovers (five fumbles and an interception) while Notre Dame had only two turnovers.

== Aftermath ==
It ended the Longhorns' 30-game winning streak, which is currently (as of October 2011) the 12th longest winning streak in NCAA Division I records. Notre Dame had defeated Oklahoma in 1957 to end their 47-game win streak.

Second-ranked Ohio State lost to Stanford in the Rose Bowl, while #3 Nebraska won the Orange Bowl and was named the AP national champion for the 1970 season, with Notre Dame as runner-up.

Texas had been selected as the national champion by the UPI Coaches' Poll, whose final edition was then released at the end of the regular season, prior to bowl games. After a similar occurrence in 1973, the Coaches Poll released its final edition after the bowl games, starting with the 1974 season.
