= Mike Campbell (American football, born 1922) =

American football player and coach (1922–1998)

Biographical details
- Born: May 9, 1922; Knox County, Tennessee, U.S.
- Died: June 16, 1998 (aged 76); Austin, Texas, U.S.

Playing career
- 1945: Ole Miss
- Position: End

Coaching career (HC unless noted)
- 1955: Mississippi State (assistant)
- 1956: Washington (assistant)
- 1957–1966: Texas (assistant)
- 1967–1973: Texas (DC)
- 1974–1976: Texas (AHC/DC)

William Mike Campbell (May 9, 1922 – June 16, 1998) was an American football player and coach. He was a long-time assistant of Darrell Royal, first at Mississippi State, then Washington, and mostly Texas.

A native of Memphis, Tennessee, Campbell played college football at the University of Mississippi and was drafted in the 32nd round of the 1946 NFL draft by the Washington Redskins, but chose not to play professional football. He began coaching soon after his playing career, becoming highly successful in the Mississippi High School ranks at Gulf Coast Military Academy, Canton, and Vicksburg.

He was hired by then-Mississippi State coach Royal in 1955, and went with him to Washington, and later Texas. In 1967, he was placed in charge of the Longhorn defense, and in 1974 was named assistant head coach.

After Royal's retirement in 1976, Fred Akers, then head coach at Wyoming, was chosen over Campbell as Royal's successor, a decision that was a source of controversy among Texas fans. Campbell retired from coaching afterwards.

Campbell's twin sons, Mike Jr. and Tom, were defensive starters on Texas' 1969 national championship team. Tom's interception with just over one minute remaining in the Longhorns' regular season finale vs. No. 2 Arkansas sealed Texas' 15–14 victory and the UPI coaches' poll championship.
