= 1969 Cotton Bowl Classic =

- 33rd Cotton Bowl Classic
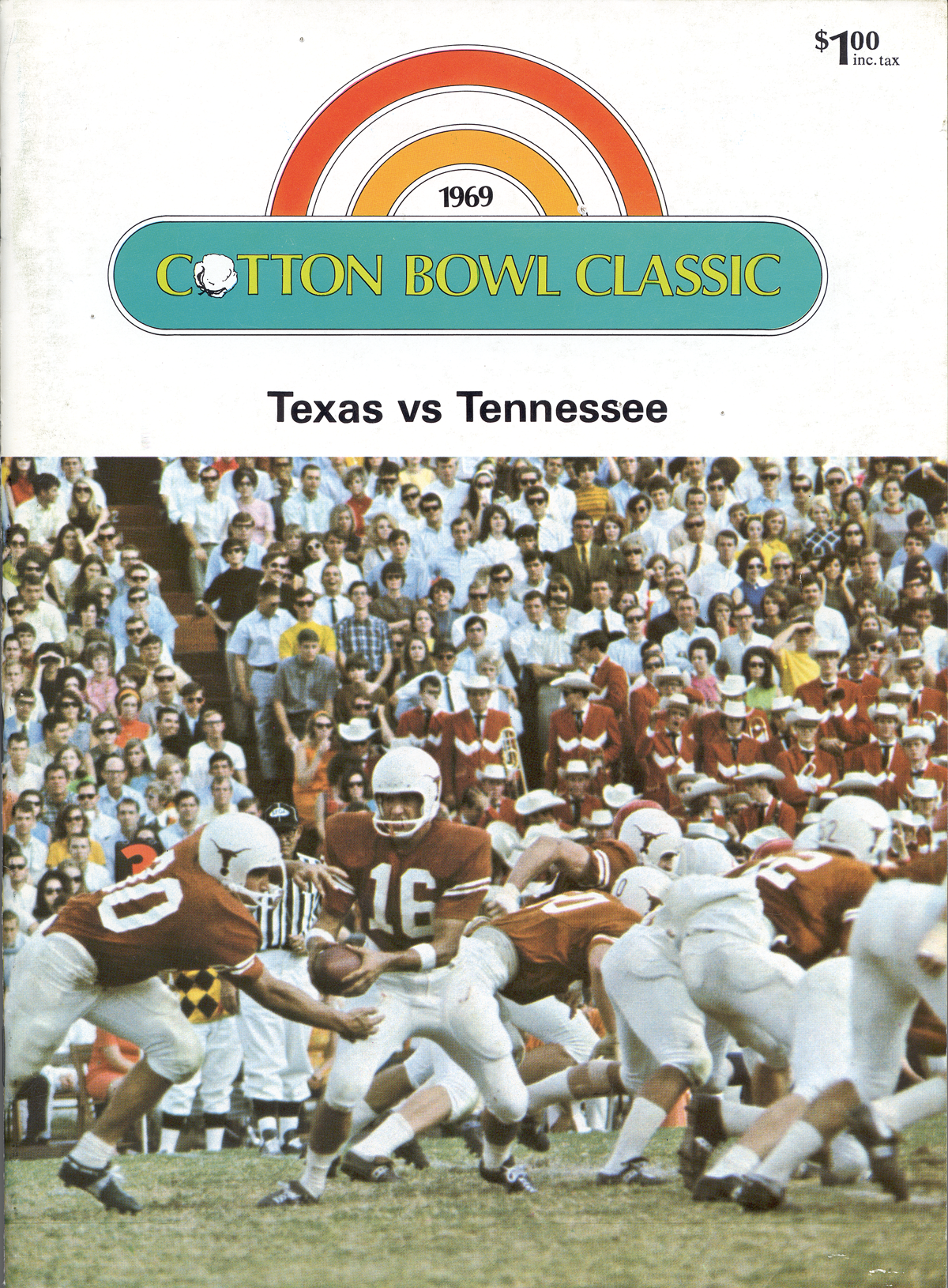
Tennessee Volunteers	Texas Longhorns
(8–1–1)	(8–1–1)
SEC	SWC
13	36
Head coach: Doug Dickey	Head coach: Darrell Royal
AP / Coaches; 8 / 7	AP / Coaches; 5 / 5
	1	2	3	4	Total
Tennessee	0	0	7	6	13
Texas	13	15	8	0	36
- Date: January 1, 1969
- Season: 1968
- Stadium: Cotton Bowl
- Location: Dallas, Texas
- MVP: LB Tom Campbell (Texas); WR Cotton Speyrer (Texas); QB James Street (Texas)
- Referee: McDuff Simpson (SWC) (split crew: SWC, SEC)
- Attendance: 70,000

United States TV coverage
- Network: CBS

The Cotton Bowl in Dallas, Texas, hosted the Cotton Bowl Classic.

The 1969 Cotton Bowl Classic featured the Texas Longhorns versus the Tennessee Volunteers.

== Background ==
In the 1951 Cotton Bowl Classic, the Volunteers upset the Longhorns 20–14. In the 1953 Cotton Bowl Classic, Texas beat Tennessee 16–0. This was the third Cotton Bowl between the two teams. Texas was Southwest Conference co-champions due to losing to Texas Tech early in the season, thus they shared it with Arkansas. Tennessee finished 2nd in the Southeastern Conference to Georgia due to losing to Auburn late in the season.

== Game summary ==
It may have been a matchup of top 10 teams, but Texas beat them like any ordinary team as they scored 28 points in the first half while allowing none. Steve Worster, Ted Koy, and Chris Gilbert each had touchdown runs, and Cotton Speyrer caught two touchdown passes from James Street, the last one making it 36–6. In the second half, Tennessee scored on a Gary Kreis catch from Bobby Scott to make it 28–6 and Mike Price caught a touchdown pass to narrow it to 36–13, but by that point, there was only two minutes left in the game.

== Aftermath ==
Texas went unbeaten the following season and returned to the Cotton Bowl Classic to face off against Notre Dame, winning that game, and with it, the National Championship.

== Outstanding Players of the Game ==
Texas

- Tom Campbell, who helped Texas' defense limit Tennessee to just 275 yards offense.
- Cotton Speyrer, who caught two touchdown passes on five catches for 161 yards.
- James Street, who went 7–13 for 200 yards and two touchdowns.

== Statistics ==
Statistics	Texas	Tennessee
First downs	22	16
Yards rushing	279	83
Yards passing	234	192
Total yards	513	275
Punts-Average	7-40.7	8-42.1
Fumbles-Lost	3-2	5-0
Interceptions	1	3
Penalties-Yards	5-60	4-17
