= Jim Bertelsen =

American football player (1950–2021)

No. 35, 45
- Position: Running back

Personal information
- Born: February 26, 1950; Saint Paul, Minnesota, U.S.
- Died: May 7, 2021 (aged 71); San Marcos, Texas, U.S.
- Listed height: 5 ft 11 in (1.80 m)
- Listed weight: 205 lb (93 kg)

Career information
- High school: Hudson (Hudson, Wisconsin)
- College: Texas
- NFL draft: 1972: 2nd round, 30th overall pick

Career history
- Los Angeles Rams (1972–1976)

Awards and highlights
- Pro Bowl (1973); 2× National champion (1969, 1970); Cotton Bowl Champion - (1970); Southwest Conference Champion - 1969, 1970, 1971; Third-team All-American (1969); 2× First-team All-SWC (1969, 1971)

Career NFL statistics
- Rushing attempts: 614
- Rushing yards: 2,466
- Total touchdowns: 18
- Stats at Pro Football Reference

James Allen Bertelsen (February 26, 1950 – May 7, 2021) was an American professional football player who was a running back for five seasons in the National Football League (NFL) with the Los Angeles Rams. He played college football for the Texas Longhorns and was selected by the Rams in the second round of the 1972 NFL draft.

== College career ==
As a sophomore at the University of Texas at Austin in 1969 he, James Street, Steve Worster, and Ted Koy led the Longhorns to a national championship using the wishbone option offense. He was named a 3rd-string All-American that year. In 1970 he again helped lead Texas to the National Championship, though they lost the Cotton Bowl, as he was named all-conference. As a senior and a team captain in 1971, Bertlesen was the team's lead ground gainer, leading them to a 3rd straight Southwest Conference Championship and making the All-Conference team again.

In his career at Texas (1969–1971), he rushed for 2,510 yards, averaging 6.1 yards a carry and 33 touchdowns, and also had nine 100-yard rushing games. He led the team in rushing in 1969 and 1971, in scoring in 1969 and in total offense in 1969, 1970 and 1971.

In a 1969 game against SMU he tied the then school record, set by Bobby Layne, of 4 touchdowns in a single game. In that same game he, Steve Worster, Ted Koy and James Street became the school's only foursome to rush for 100-yards in a single game.

After his senior year, he played in the College All-Star Football Game in Chicago and the 1972 Senior Bowl.

He was named to the Texas Longhorn Hall of Honor in 1995.

== Professional career ==
Bertelsen was selected in the second round of the 1972 NFL draft by the Los Angeles Rams with the 30th overall pick. For the Rams he was also a kick and punt returner. He averaged four yards per carry as a pro, and rushed for 854 yards in 1973. In 1974 he had 1395 all-purpose yards and 5 TDs earning him a trip to the Pro Bowl and he was the Rams leading rusher in the 1974 NFC Championship game. He played in another NFC Championship game with the Rams in 1976. He was released by the Rams a few days before the start of the 1977 regular season due to an injury. Later that season, the Colts considered him as a free agent replacement for the injured Roosevelt Leaks.

== Later life ==
After his NFL career, Bertelsen returned to the Austin area where he owned and trained racehorses, owned and operated a bar and then moved into sales positions in the construction field and then the oil business where he worked until his retirement in 2013.

He died on May 7, 2021. He was divorced at the time of his death. He had a son, a daughter and a granddaughter.

== NFL career statistics ==
Legend
**Bold**	Career high

=== Regular season ===
Year	Team	Games		Rushing					Receiving				
Year	Team	GP	GS	Att	Yds	Avg	Lng	TD	Rec	Yds	Avg	Lng	TD
1972	RAM	**14**	7	123	581	**4.7**	42	**5**	**29**	**331**	11.4	22	**1**
1973	RAM	**14**	**14**	**206**	**854**	4.1	**49**	4	19	267	14.1	**44**	**1**
1974	RAM	13	13	127	419	3.3	20	2	20	175	8.8	19	0
1975	RAM	13	11	116	457	3.9	19	3	14	208	**14.9**	22	0
1976	RAM	**14**	0	42	155	3.7	18	2	6	33	5.5	10	0
Total		68	45	614	2,466	4.0	49	16	88	1,014	11.5	44	2

=== Playoffs ===
Year	Team	Games		Rushing					Receiving				
Year	Team	GP	GS	Att	Yds	Avg	Lng	TD	Rec	Yds	Avg	Lng	TD
1973	RAM	1	1	12	37	3.1	**13**	0	0	0	0.0	0	0
1974	RAM	**2**	**2**	**20**	**99**	**5.0**	11	0	**6**	**58**	**9.7**	**13**	0
1976	RAM	**2**	0	0	0	0.0	0	0	0	0	0.0	0	0
Total		5	3	32	136	4.3	13	0	6	58	9.7	13	0
