= Leo Brooks (American football) =

American football player (1947–2002)

No. 73, 70
- Positions: Defensive tackle, Offensive lineman

Personal information
- Born: December 7, 1947; Shidler, Oklahoma, U.S.
- Died: April 4, 2002 (aged 54); Houston, Texas, U.S.
- Listed height: 6 ft 5 in (1.96 m)
- Listed weight: 261 lb (118 kg)

Career information
- High school: Kermit (TX)
- College: Texas (1966-1969)
- NFL draft: 1970: 2nd round, 31st overall pick

Career history
- Houston Oilers (1970–1972); New Orleans Saints (1973)*; St. Louis Cardinals (1973–1976)
- * Offseason or practice squad member only

Awards and highlights
- National champion (1969); Second-team All-American (1969); 2× First-team All-SWC (1968, 1969); Southwest Conference Champion - (1968, 1969); Cotton Bowl Champion (1969, 1970)

Career NFL statistics
- Sacks: 10.5
- Fumble recoveries: 3
- Interceptions: 1
- Stats at Pro Football Reference

Leonard Leo Brooks Jr. (December 7, 1947 – April 4, 2002) was an American professional football player who was a defensive lineman for Houston Oilers and the St. Louis Cardinals of the National Football League (NFL). He was an All-American college football player for the Texas Longhorns where he won a National Championship.

== Early life ==
Brooks was born in Shindler, Oklahoma, and later moved to Kermit, Texas, where he played football at Kermit High School.

== College career ==
Brooks played college football at Texas from 1967-69. He was an all-conference selection in 1968 and 1969 and a 2nd team UPI All-American in 1969.

In 1968 he moved from offense to defense during the year and helped lead the Longhorns to a share of the 1968 Southwest Conference (SWC) Championship and a berth in the Cotton Bowl where they defeated #8 Tennessee to finish ranked #5/#3. That season they started a 30-game winning streak, still the 7th longest in college football history and the longest in school history as of 2025.

The next year, he helped Texas win an undisputed National Championship as well as the Southwest Conference Championship and the 1970 Cotton Bowl Classic, though he suffered a knee injury half way through the season and had to have ligament surgery on his right knee in November.

In 2002, Brooks was inducted into the Longhorn Hall of Honor.

== Pro career ==
Brooks was drafted by the Houston Oilers in the second round of the 1970 NFL draft. He played for the Oilers for three seasons and missed part of the 1971 season with the Oilers with a broken collar bone suffered in December against the Steelers. At the start of the 1973 season he was traded to the New Orleans Saints for running back Bob Gresham.

Brooks was cut by the Saints, but in late September 1973 he was signed by the St. Louis Cardinals following an injury to Bonnie Sloan. He played in 13 games that season, the most of his career up to that point and racked up a career high 5.5 sacks. In 1974 he played in a career high 14 games and started a career high 13 while helping the Cardinals make the playoffs for the first time in 10 years. He took on a back-up roll in 1975 and in 1976 he was cut at the end of training camp, but was resigned a month later when Marvin Upshaw didn't work out. Following the death of his father-in-law that spring, he decided not to show up for camp and gave up his football playing career. He returned to Austin to run the family business.

== Later life ==
Brooks was the president and CEO of the Leo Brooks Company, which was involved in ranching, commercial real estate appraising and hunting leases.

His son, Corby Brooks played offensive line at Texas from 1994-95.
