= Cotton Speyrer =

American football player (born 1949)

No. 28, 82
- Position: Wide receiver

Personal information
- Born: April 29, 1949 (age 77); Port Arthur, Texas, U.S.
- Listed height: 6 ft 0 in (1.83 m)
- Listed weight: 175 lb (79 kg)

Career information
- High school: Thomas Jefferson (Port Arthur)
- College: Texas
- NFL draft: 1971: 2nd round, 38th overall pick

Career history
- Baltimore Colts (1972–1974); Miami Dolphins (1975)

Awards and highlights
- 2× National champion (1969, 1970); 2× First-team All-American (1969, 1970); First-team All-SWC (1969); Second-team All-SWC (1970); Cotton Bowl MVP (1969)

Career NFL statistics
- Receptions: 34
- Receiving yards: 535
- Receiving TDs: 5
- Stats at Pro Football Reference

Charles Wayne Speyrer (born April 29, 1949) is an American former professional football player who was a wide receiver in the National Football League (NFL) for the Baltimore Colts and Miami Dolphins and who, while he played college football for the Texas Longhorns was a principal player in a drive the won Texas the 1969 National Championship.

== Early life ==
Speyrer was born in Port Arthur, Texas on April 29, 1949, but spent some time growing up in Brownsville, where he got the nickname "Cotton" due to his white hair. He attended Port Arthur's Jefferson High School. Speyrer was a tailback in high school, who scored rushing, receiving and even passing, as well as while returning kickoffs in his senior year (1967). Speyrer was selected first-team All-State, with a 10.2 yards per carry rushing average, while scoring 18 touchdowns.

== College Football ==
Speyer became a two-time All-American receiver at the University of Texas at Austin. He played on the Texas varsity from 1968-70. He is a member of the University of Texas Hall of Honor and in 2001, was inducted into the Cotton Bowl Hall of Fame. He is the only player ever named to the Cotton Bowl All-Decade team in two different decades. Speyer was All-Conference and first-team All-American in 1969; and was second-team All-Conference and a first-team All-American again in 1970.

As a sophomore, he led the team with 26 receptions for 449 yards, and four touchdowns. He rushed the ball four times for 139 yards (19.6 yards per carry) and one touchdown. The team was 9–1–1 under coach Darrell Royal, and was ranked 3rd in the nation by the Associated Press (AP) that year. Texas defeated Tennessee in the Cotton Bowl on January 1, 1969, 36–13. Speyrer had five receptions for 161 yards, including touchdown catches of 79 and 78 yards. Speyrer shared the Cotton Bowl Most Valuable Player (MVP) honors with teammates Tom Campbell and quarterback James Street.

In 1969, Speyrer caught 30 passes for 492 yards and three touchdowns. Texas went 11–0, and was ranked first in the nation by the AP at the end of the year. Texas won two historic games that season, against Arkansas in December, and the January 1, 1970 Cotton Bowl against the University of Notre Dame. On December 6, 1969, Texas achieved a 15–14 come-from-behind victory over No. 2 Arkansas in the "Game of the Century" with President Richard M Nixon in attendance. Nixon declared Texas national champions, angering the fans of the equally undefeated Penn State team, to which Penn State Coach Joe Paterno added years later, "‘I wondered how President Nixon could know so little about Watergate in 1973, and know so much about college football in 1969.’" The AP voters agreed with Nixon, however, and ranked Texas first at the end of the year (with 36 out of 45 votes).

Speyrer had four catches for 65 yards in the Arkansas game. Texas won the Southwest Conference, and that victory earned Texas the right to represent the Southwest Conference in the Cotton Bowl again, where their opponent was the eighth-ranked Irish, featuring Joe Theismann.

Less than a month after the Arkansas game, Speyrer was a key play-maker in what is considered by some to be the most famous drive in Texas history. This was Notre Dame's first bowl game in over 40 years, but early on, the game had the makings of a big upset when Notre Dame charged out to a 10–0 lead. The Longhorns later took a 14–10 lead, but Theisman led an 80-yard scoring drive that put the Irish up 17–14 with seven minutes to go in the game. Starting on their own 24-yard line, the Longhorns embarked upon a fourth-quarter, 17-play march that included a pair of fourth-and-two conversions, the last coming at the Notre Dame 10 when James Street completed a clutch (though almost too short) pass to a turning and diving Speyrer that took the Horns to the two. From there, it took three plays before Billy Dale pushed the ball over the goal line to cement UT's second national title—Texas 21, Notre Dame 17. Speyrer caught four passes for 70 yards. The final Texas drive is considered one of the most unforgettable in Cotton Bowl history.

Speyrer only played four games for Texas in 1970, but he is also known for his last-minute 45-yard touchdown catch during his senior year in a come-from-behind 20–17 win during the Texas–UCLA game in the fall of 1970. The catch and victory was a key part of Texas finishing the regular season undefeated where they were awarded their 3rd National title (1963, 1969 and 1970) by the UPI Coaches Poll. The AP ranked Texas at No. 3 that year.

== Pro Football ==
Speyrer was the 38th overall selection in the second round of the 1971 NFL draft by the Washington Redskins. He was traded along with a 1973 first-rounder (25th overall–traded to San Diego Chargers for Marty Domres) from the Redskins to the Baltimore Colts for Roy Jefferson and ninth-round draft picks in 1973 (218th overall–Rick Galbos) and 1974 (213th overall–traded to Los Angeles Rams for Joe Sweet) on July 31, 1971. He spent five seasons in the NFL, four with the Colts, and one final year with the Miami Dolphins.

He did not see any playing time in 1971 due to a broken arm, and only took the field in five games in 1972 because of a hamstring injury. In 1973, he had 311 yards receiving, with four touchdowns and an 18.3 yards per catch average. He also had a 101-yard kickoff return for a touchdown, the second longest of the season. The 101-yard return is one of the 100 longest returns in NFL history. In a December 2, 1973 game against the New York Jets, Speyrer threw a 54-yard touchdown pass to Glenn Doughty. He continued primarily as a kick returner in 1974.

In 1975, he was traded back to the Redskins for a 12th round draft choice after feeling he had been given a "raw deal" in Baltimore. He injured his wrist in spring training. He left Redskins training camp during the 2nd week after complaining that he was not getting enough chances to play and was traded to Miami for an undisclosed future pick. Two days after joining the Dolphins he led them to a 20-17 victory over the Saints after catching three passes of longer than 50 yards in an exhibition game. He was nonetheless cut by the Dolphins before the season started. He returned to the Dolphins later that season, seeing little playing time and then retired in early 1976.

== Personal life ==
After retiring, Speyrer worked in the computer software industry. He also worked in the office of Texas State Comptroller Susan Combs.
