= Highlands High School (San Antonio) =

Location
- 3118 Elgin Avenue; San Antonio, Bexar County, Texas 78210; United States; 29.389358°N 98.442342°W

Information
- School type: Public, high school
- Established: 1958
- Locale: City: Large
- School district: San Antonio ISD
- NCES School ID: 483873004360
- Principal: Adrian Hid (2025 - Present)
- Faculty: 109.37 (on an FTE basis)
- Grades: 9–12
- Enrollment: 1,651 (2022–2023)
- Student to teacher ratio: 15.10
- Color
- Team name: Owls
- Website: Official website

Highlands High School is a public high school located in San Antonio, Texas and classified as a 5A school by the University Interscholastic League. This school is one of twelve high schools in the San Antonio Independent School District. During 2022–2023, Highlands High School had an enrollment of 1,651 students and a student to teacher ratio of 15.10. The school received an overall rating of "C" from the Texas Education Agency for the 2024–2025 school year.

== Athletics ==
The Highlands Owls compete in the following sports:

- Baseball
- Basketball
- Cross Country
- Football
- Golf
- Soccer
- Softball
- Swimming and Diving
- Tennis
- Track and Field
- Volleyball
- Wrestling
- Lacrosse

== Clubs & Organizations ==
The Highlands Owls have a variety of clubs and organizations such as:

- Junior Reserve Officers' Training Corps
- Police Explorers
- National Honor Society
- Sociedad Honoraria Hispánica (Spanish Honor Society)
- Yearbook Club
- Student Council
- The Mighty Owl Band
- Choir
- Highlands P-Tech - Aerospace, Manufacturing, Welding Programs
- Owl Cheerleading
- The Highsteppers
- Theater
- Art Club
- Poetry Club
- Gardening Club
- Highlands Go-Green Club

== Notable people ==
=== Alumni ===
- Julius Whittier, first black football letterman on the Texas Longhorns at the University of Texas.
- Jesse Hoag, a student at Highlands that was widely known as the mascot "Hootie" that left an impact on many students and parents.

=== Faculty ===
- Noah Lipman, an American Criminal Defense Attorney and AP Teacher born and raised in Manhattan, New York. He was known to have been an outstanding teacher who was recognized for significantly raising AP scores with his teaching.
