= James Street (American football) =

American football and baseball player (1948–2013)

No. 16
- Position: Quarterback

Personal information
- Born: August 2, 1948; Longview, Texas, U.S.
- Died: September 30, 2013 (aged 65); Austin, Texas, U.S.
- Listed height: 5 ft 11 in (1.80 m)
- Listed weight: 175 lb (79 kg)

Career information
- High school: Longview (Longview, Texas)
- College: Texas Longhorns (1967–1969)

Awards and highlights
- 1969 Cotton Bowl Outstanding Offensive Player; 1969 Texas Longhorns Football MVP; First-team All-SWC (1969); Cotton Bowl Hall of Fame (1999); Texas Sports Hall of Fame (2000); National champion (1969); 2x Southwest Conference champion (1968–1969); Longest pass and longest touchdown pass by Texas Longhorn in a bowl game (79 yards); Highest Texas Longhorn winning percentage, career (20-0); Most yards per attempt in a Cotton Bowl (15.4); Most yards on touchdown passes in a Cotton Bowl (157)

Other information
- Baseball career
- Pitcher

NCAA University Division debut
- 1968, for the Texas Longhorns

Last appearance
- 1970, for the Texas Longhorns

Career highlights and awards
- 3x All-Southwest Conference (1968–1970); 2x 2nd-team All-American (1968–1969); Longhorn Baseball Hall of Honor (1982); 3x Southwest Conference champion (1968–1970)

James Lowell Street (August 2, 1948 – September 30, 2013) was a two-sport star athlete at the University of Texas. As quarterback, he led the team to the 1969 National Championship in football and posted a perfect 20–0 record, the most wins without a loss in Longhorns history. As a pitcher he was a two time All-American who threw the only perfect game in Texas Longhorns history.

== Early life ==
James Street was born in 1948 in Longview, Texas, the son of Helen Frederick (Eaton) and Grover Wilson Street, Sr. He had a hardscrabble childhood that became more difficult at 12 when his parents divorced and his father moved back to Oklahoma. James worked odd jobs in junior high and high school to help feed him and his twin sister. At Longview High School he lettered in football, baseball, basketball and track, but was not heavily recruited.

His brother Sewell Street played two years of minor league baseball in the Cardinals organization in Wytheville and Keokuk.

== Football career ==
Street arrived at Texas as a seventh-string quarterback in 1966.

After playing only a handful of plays in two blowout games in 1967, Street came into the 1968 season as the backup to Bill Bradley. That year, Darrell Royal and assistant Emory Bellard introduced the wishbone. After tying #11 Houston in the first game and a slow start in the second against Texas Tech, Street took over at quarterback. "Hell, you can’t do any worse. Get in there," Royal reportedly said when replacing Bradley with Street. Despite running up 22 points in the third quarter, Texas would lose that game, but Street would never find himself on the losing side again. He engineered the Longhorns' offense from that game to the 1970 Cotton Bowl Classic, reeling off 20 straight wins without a loss. He ended his junior year playing what may have been the best game of his career in the 1969 Cotton Bowl against Tennessee. In that game he twice broke the school record for longest touchdown pass in a bowl game, first with a 78-yard TD pass to Cotton Speyrer in the 1st quarter and then with a 79-yard TD pass in the 3rd. He threw for 200 yards and was named one of the game's three "Outstanding Players."

As a starting quarterback in his senior campaign, he led the Longhorns to a perfect season, beating Arkansas in "The Game of the Century" for one half of the National Championship and Notre Dame in the Cotton Bowl Classic for the other half. The Arkansas game is the one for which he is best known. In that game he ran for a crucial 42-yard touchdown and hit Randy Peschel on a game-saving fourth-and-3 to set up the winning touchdown. The Longhorns were declared National Champions by President Richard Nixon, who had attended the game. In the 1970 Cotton Bowl, Street led the Longhorns to a come-from-behind win after Notre Dame took a 10-point lead. In the 4th quarter, down by 3, he initiated a game-winning touchdown drive that featured two fourth down conversions. The last was converted on a Street pass, thrown under duress and short, that was caught by a diving Speyrer just before it hit the ground. Texas scored the game-winning touchdown with 1:08 on the clock. After the game, he was congratulated by former President Lyndon Johnson who had attended the game.

=== Records ===
- **UT – Longest pass in a bowl game, (79), broke his own record set earlier in the game**
- **UT – Longest touchdown pass in a bowl game, (79), broke his own record set earlier in the game**
- **UT – Most wins without a loss, career (20–0)**
- UT – Highest Average Gain Per Pass Completion (min. 30 completions), season (17.5), surpassed by Eddie Phillips in 1970
- **Cotton Bowl – Most yards per attempt, game (15.4)**
- **Cotton Bowl – Most yards on touchdown passes, game (157)**
- Cotton Bowl – Passing yards, career (307), surpassed by Joe Theismann in 1971
- **UT & Southwest Conference – Best winning percentage (minimum 1 season), career - 100%**

Bold means still active

== Baseball career ==
Street was a two-time Second-Team All-American baseball player who posted a 29–8 record on the mound. He made the All-Southwest Conference Team three years in a row and was the team's MVP every year. In 1968, he led the team in wins, earned run average, innings pitched and strikeouts. He threw a no-hitter in 1969 against SMU and another in 1970 against Texas Tech. The Texas Tech no-hitter was a perfect game, the only one in the history of the Southwest Conference or the University of Texas. He helped Texas win three Southwest Conference titles and go to three straight College World Series, finishing as high as third in 1970.

=== Records ===
- Southwest Conference & UT – Most no-hitters, career (2), tied Bobby Layne, tied by Burt Hooton and Greg Swindell
- Southwest Conference & UT – Most perfect games, season and career (1)
- UT – Opponents batting average, career (0.198), surpassed by Hooton in 1971
- UT – Complete games, career (21), surpassed by Hooton in 1971

== Later life ==
Street was drafted in the 31st round of the 1970 Major League Baseball Draft by the Cleveland Indians but, after suffering an injury at the 1970 College World Series, he chose not to play in the Indians' farm system, thereby ending his career. He was also drafted by the Dallas Rockets of the Texas Football League in the first round of their 1970 draft. His rights were traded to the San Antonio Toros and then to the Fort Worth Braves, with whom he had a workout, but he never signed with them.

In 1991, Street started a successful career as a settlement planner, owning his own business, The James Street Group. He had five sons, including three who won National Championships playing baseball for Texas. His oldest son Ryan Street, from his first marriage attended Texas Tech. Street and his wife of 32 years, Janie Street had four sons, former Longhorn and professional closer Huston Street, former Longhorn and minor league pitcher Juston Street, former Longhorn pitcher Jordon Street and Pepperdine infielder Hanson Street who earned an MBA at the Red McCombs School of Business at the University of Texas. Juston Street went into acting, and one of his first film appearances was playing his father, James Street, in the film My All American.

Street died of a heart attack at his home in Austin, Texas, on September 30, 2013.
