= 1969 Texas Longhorns football team =

American college football season

1969 Texas Longhorns football

Consensus national champion SWC champion Cotton Bowl Classic champion

Cotton Bowl Classic, W 21–17 vs. Notre Dame
- Conference: Southwest Conference

Ranking
- Coaches: No. 1
- AP: No. 1
- Record: 11–0 (7–0 SWC)
- Head coach: Darrell Royal (13th season)
- Offensive coordinator: Emory Bellard
- Offensive scheme: Wishbone
- Defensive coordinator: Mike Campbell
- Base defense: 4–4
- Home stadium: Memorial Stadium

1969 Southwest Conference football standings
| | Conf. | | | | | Overall |
| Team | W | | L | | T | W | | L | | T |
|---|---|---|---|---|---|---|---|---|---|---|
| No. 1 Texas $ | 7 | – | 0 | – | 0 | 11 | – | 0 | – | 0 |
| No. 7 Arkansas | 6 | – | 1 | – | 0 | 9 | – | 2 | – | 0 |
| Texas Tech | 4 | – | 3 | – | 0 | 5 | – | 5 | – | 0 |
| TCU | 4 | – | 3 | – | 0 | 4 | – | 6 | – | 0 |
| SMU | 3 | – | 4 | – | 0 | 3 | – | 7 | – | 0 |
| Rice | 2 | – | 5 | – | 0 | 3 | – | 7 | – | 0 |
| Texas A&M | 2 | – | 5 | – | 0 | 3 | – | 7 | – | 0 |
| Baylor | 0 | – | 7 | – | 0 | 0 | – | 10 | – | 0 |
$ – Conference champion; Rankings from AP Poll

The 1969 Texas Longhorns football team represented the University of Texas at Austin in the 1969 NCAA University Division football season. The Longhorns won all eleven games to win their second consensus national championship; the first was six seasons earlier in 1963. This was the last consensus title won by the Longhorns until 2005.

The 1969 team is the last all-white team to be named consensus national champions with the onset of racial integration. Julius Whittier, the first African-American player in Texas football history, was enrolled at UT as a freshman but was not eligible to play; NCAA rules of the time barred freshmen from playing varsity football and basketball.

Ranked fourth to start the year, the #2 Longhorns defeated rival Oklahoma by ten points on October 11, and gained the top spot in the polls in late November. On December 6, #1 Texas traveled to Fayetteville to meet second-ranked Arkansas; down by fourteen points in the fourth quarter, UT rallied to win 15–14 in the season's "Game of the Century," attended by President Richard Nixon who presented a plaque to Texas and declared them the national champions. With a wishbone option offense, the Longhorns won all ten games in the regular season, and returned to the Cotton Bowl Classic in Fair Park in Dallas.

On New Year's Day 1970, the Longhorns met ninth-ranked Notre Dame, in its first bowl game in 45 years and second overall; their only previous postseason appearance was a win in the 1925 Rose Bowl. Trailing for most of the game, Texas scored with 68 seconds remaining and won 21–17, validating Nixon's clam. On their final drive, the Longhorns faced fourth down twice. It was their twentieth consecutive victory, second straight Cotton Bowl Classic title, and third win that season in the stadium.

== Schedule ==
| Date | Time | Opponent | Rank | Site | TV | Result | Attendance | Source |
|---|---|---|---|---|---|---|---|---|
| September 20 | 3:00 p.m. | at California* | No. 4 | California Memorial Stadium; Berkeley, CA | ABC | W 17–0 | 31,000–33,702 | |
| September 27 | 7:30 p.m. | Texas Tech | No. 4 | Memorial Stadium; Austin, TX (rivalry) | | W 49–7 | 65,200 | |
| October 4 | 7:31 p.m. | Navy* | No. 2 | Memorial Stadium; Austin, TX | | W 56–17 | 63,500 | |
| October 11 | 1:00 p.m. | vs. No. 8 Oklahoma* | No. 2 | Cotton Bowl; Dallas, TX (Red River Shootout) | ABC | W 27–17 | 71,938 | |
| October 25 | 1:30 p.m. | Rice | No. 2 | Memorial Stadium; Austin, TX (rivalry) | | W 31–0 | 61,500 | |
| November 1 | 1:00 p.m. | at SMU | No. 2 | Cotton Bowl; Dallas, TX | | W 45–14 | 55,287 | |
| November 8 | 2:00 p.m. | Baylor | No. 2 | Memorial Stadium; Austin, TX (rivalry) | | W 56–14 | 51,000–55,000 | |
| November 15 | 2:00 p.m. | TCU | No. 2 | Memorial Stadium; Austin, TX (rivalry) | | W 69–7 | 51,000 | |
| November 27 | 1:00 p.m. | at Texas A&M | No. 1 | Kyle Field; College Station, TX (rivalry) | | W 49–12 | 51,160 | |
| December 6 | 12:00 p.m. | at No. 2 Arkansas | No. 1 | Razorback Stadium; Fayetteville, AR (Game of The Century, rivalry) | ABC | W 15–14 | 44,598 | |
| January 1, 1970 | 1:00 p.m. | vs. No. 9 Notre Dame* | No. 1 | Cotton Bowl; Dallas, TX (Cotton Bowl Classic) | CBS | W 21–17 | 71,938 | |
*Non-conference game; Rankings from AP Poll released prior to the game; All times are in Central time

== Rankings ==
Ranking movements Legend: ██ Increase in ranking ██ Decrease in ranking
| | Week | | | | | | | | | | | | | |
| Poll | Pre | 1 | 2 | 3 | 4 | 5 | 6 | 7 | 8 | 9 | 10 | 11 | 12 | Final |
|---|---|---|---|---|---|---|---|---|---|---|---|---|---|---|
| AP | 4 | 4 | 4 | 2 | 2 | 2 | 2 | 2 | 2 | 2 | 1 | 1 | 1 | 1 |
| UPI Coaches | 3 | 3 | 3 | 4 | 2 | 2 | 2 | 2 | 2 | 2 | 1 | 1 | 1 | 1 |

== Game summaries ==
=== At California ===
Texas Longhorns (0–0) vs. California Golden Bears (0–0)

| Quarter | 1 | 2 | 3 | 4 | Total |
|---|---|---|---|---|---|
| No. 4 Texas | 7 | 7 | 3 | 0 | 17 |
| California | 0 | 0 | 0 | 0 | 0 |

at California Memorial Stadium • Berkeley, CA

- Date: Saturday, September 20, 1969
- Game time: 3:00 PM CDT
- Game weather: Good
- Game attendance: 31,000–33,702
- Referee: John Presley
- TV: ABC
- Box Score

Game information

First Quarter

- (7:53) UT – Jim Bertelsen 11 yard run (Feller kick), UT 7–0; 11 plays, 70 yards

Second Quarter

- (8:04) UT – James Street 4 yard run (Feller kick), UT 14–0; 11 plays, 55 yards

Third Quarter

- (4:49) UT – Happy Feller 32 yard field goal, UT 17–0; 8 plays, 36 yards

| Statistics | TEX | CAL |
|---|---|---|
| First downs | 21 | 10 |
| Total yards | 329 | 206 |
| Rushes/yards | 71/311 | 40/127 |
| Passing yards | 18 | 79 |
| Passing: Comp–Att–Int | 2–7–2 | 12–23–1 |
| Time of possession | | |

| Team | Category | Player | Statistics |
|---|---|---|---|
| Texas | Passing | James Street | 2–7, 18 yards, 2 INTs |
| Texas | Rushing | Jim Bertelsen | 16 car, 92 yards, 1 TD |
| Texas | Receiving | Randy Peschel | 1 rec, 11 yards |
| California | Passing | TEAM | 12–23, 79 yards, 1 INT |
| California | Rushing | TEAM | 40 car, 127 yards |
| California | Receiving | TEAM | 12 rec, 79 yards |

=== Vs. Texas Tech ===
Texas Tech Red Raiders (1–0) vs. Texas Longhorns (1–0)

| Quarter | 1 | 2 | 3 | 4 | Total |
|---|---|---|---|---|---|
| Texas Tech | 0 | 0 | 0 | 7 | 7 |
| No. 4 Texas | 7 | 21 | 21 | 0 | 49 |

at Memorial Stadium • Austin, TX

- Date: Saturday, September 27, 1969
- Game time: 7:31 p.m. CDT
- Game weather: Clear, 84 °F (29 °C)
- Game attendance: 65,200
- Box Score

Game information

First Quarter

- (10:04) UT – Billy Dale 12 yard run (Feller kick), UT 7–0; 4 plays, 27 yards, 1:31

Second Quarter

- (13:40) UT – Jim Bertelsen 5 yard run (Feller kick), UT 14–0; 9 plays, 49 yards, 2:03
- (11:00) UT – Steve Worster 1 yard run (Feller kick), UT 21–0; 4 plays, 47 yards, 1:14
- (1:17) UT – Mike Campbell 26 yard interception return (Feller kick), UT 28–0

Third Quarter

- (13:23) UT – Steve Worster 2 yard run (Feller kick), UT 35–0; 1 play, 2 yards, 0:05
- (7:26) UT – Billy Dale 2 yard run (Feller kick), UT 42–0; 4 plays, 9 yards, 1:44
- (0:56) UT – Paul Robichau 14 yard run (Feller kick), UT 49–0; 9 plays, 54 yards, 3:49

Fourth Quarter

- (12:10) TTU – Odom 9 yard pass from Napper (Sanders kick), UT 49–7; 11 plays, 79 yards, 3:46

| Statistics | TTU | TEX |
|---|---|---|
| First downs | 11 | 14 |
| Total yards | 213 | 286 |
| Rushes/yards | 41/42 | 57/257 |
| Passing yards | 171 | 29 |
| Passing: Comp–Att–Int | 14–34–4 | 10–3–1 |
| Time of possession | | |

| Team | Category | Player | Statistics |
|---|---|---|---|
| Texas Tech | Passing | TEAM | 14–34, 171 yards, 1 TD, 4 INTs |
| Texas Tech | Rushing | TEAM | 41 car, 42 yards |
| Texas Tech | Receiving | TEAM | 14 rec, 171 yards, 1 TD |
| Texas | Passing | James Street | 3–9, 29 yards, 1 INT |
| Texas | Rushing | Steve Worster | 15 car, 61 yards, 2 TDs |
| Texas | Receiving | Charles Speyrer | 2 rec, 17 yards |

=== Vs. Navy ===
Navy Midshipmen (0–2) vs. Texas Longhorns (2–0)

| Quarter | 1 | 2 | 3 | 4 | Total |
|---|---|---|---|---|---|
| Navy | 3 | 0 | 7 | 7 | 17 |
| No. 2 Texas | 21 | 21 | 7 | 7 | 56 |

at Memorial Stadium • Austin, TX

- Date: Saturday, October 4, 1969
- Game time: 7:00 PM CDT
- Game weather: 81 °F (27 °C)
- Game attendance: 63,500
- Box Score

Game information

First Quarter

- (13:22) UT – Jim Bertelsen 43 yard run (Feller kick), UT 7–0; 1 play, 43 yards, 0:09
- (10:32) UT – Ted Koy 3 yard run (Feller kick), UT 14–0; 5 plays, 33 yards, 1:26
- (3:20) NAVY – Detweiler 36 yard field goal, UT 14–3; 9 plays, 42 yards, 4:36
- (1:13) UT – Ted Koy 1 yard run (Feller kick), UT 21–3; 7 plays, 52 yards, 2:07

Second Quarter

- (11:28) UT – James Street 6 yard run (Feller kick), UT 28–3; 6 plays, 34 yards, 2:28
- (4:54) UT – Terry Collins 2 yard run (Feller kick), UT 35–3; 13 plays, 82 yards, 5:20
- (0:40) UT – Eddie Phillips 15 yard run (Feller kick), UT 42–3; 6 plays, 55 yards, 1:44

Third Quarter

- (10:23) UT – Eddie Phillips 7 yard run (Feller kick), UT 49–3; 10 plays, 52 yards, 4:16
- (0:32) NAVY – Schwelm 62 yard pass from McNallen (Detweiler kick), UT 49–10; 6 plays, 69 yards, 2:06

Fourth Quarter

- (11:59) UT – Tommy Asaff 1 yard run (Rob Layne kick), UT 53–10; 11 plays, 48 yards, 3:33
- (2:50) NAVY – Steelman 4 yard run (Detweiler kick), UT 56–17; 13 plays, 63 yards, 4:08

| Statistics | NAVY | TEX |
|---|---|---|
| First downs | 15 | 32 |
| Total yards | 278 | 595 |
| Rushes/yards | 27/24 | 83/523 |
| Passing yards | 254 | 72 |
| Passing: Comp–Att–Int | 19–47–1 | 7–10–0 |
| Time of possession | | |

| Team | Category | Player | Statistics |
|---|---|---|---|
| Navy | Passing | TEAM | 19–47, 254 yards, 1 TD, 1 INT |
| Navy | Rushing | TEAM | 27 car, 24 yards, 1 TD |
| Navy | Receiving | TEAM | 19 rec, 254 yards, 1 TD |
| Texas | Passing | Donn Wigginton | 5–8, 51 yards |
| Texas | Rushing | Jim Bertelsen | 8 car, 99 yards, 1 TD |
| Texas | Receiving | Randy Peschel | 4 rec, 46 yards |

=== Vs. Oklahoma ===
Oklahoma Sooners (2–0) vs. Texas Longhorns (3–0)

| Quarter | 1 | 2 | 3 | 4 | Total |
|---|---|---|---|---|---|
| No. 8 Oklahoma | 14 | 0 | 3 | 0 | 17 |
| No. 2 Texas | 7 | 7 | 6 | 7 | 27 |

at Cotton Bowl • Dallas, TX

- Date: Saturday, October 11, 1969
- Game time: 1:00 PM CDT
- Game weather: 91 °F (33 °C)
- Game attendance: 71,938
- TV announcers (ABC): Chris Schenkel, Bud Wilkinson
- Box Score

Game information

First Quarter

- (10:14) OU – Mildren 9 yard run (Derr kick), OU 7–0; 8 plays, 41 yards, 3:03
- (3:31) OU – Owens 2 yard run (Derr kick), OU 14–0; 5 plays, 17 yards, 1:43
- (1:47) UT – Charles Speyrer 24 yard pass from James Street (Feller kick), OU 14–7; 4 plays, 58 yards, 1:46

Second Quarter

- (8:16) UT – Jim Bertelsen 1 yard run (Feller kick), Tied 14–14; 9 plays, 80 yards, 3:12

Third Quarter

- (8:39) UT – Happy Feller 27 yard field goal, UT 17–14; 10 plays, 64 yards, 3:44
- (3:06) OU – Derr 22 yard field goal, Tied 17–17; 5 plays, 24 yards, 2:04
- (0:24) UT – Happy Feller 21 yard field goal, UT 20–17; 8 plays, 68 yards, 2:34

Fourth Quarter

- (4:40) UT – Steve Worster 1 yard run (Feller kick), UT 27–17; 5 plays, 23 yards, 1:45

| Statistics | OU | TEX |
|---|---|---|
| First downs | 20 | 18 |
| Total yards | 282 | 373 |
| Rushes/yards | 63/198 | 54/158 |
| Passing yards | 84 | 215 |
| Passing: Comp–Att–Int | 9–15–2 | 9–18–3 |
| Time of possession | | |

| Team | Category | Player | Statistics |
|---|---|---|---|
| Oklahoma | Passing | TEAM | 9–15, 84 yards, 2 INTs |
| Oklahoma | Rushing | TEAM | 63 car, 192 yards, 2 TDs |
| Oklahoma | Receiving | TEAM | 9 rec, 84 yards |
| Texas | Passing | James Street | 9–18, 215 yards, 1 TD, 3 INTs |
| Texas | Rushing | Steve Worster | 18 car, 63 yards, 1 TD |
| Texas | Receiving | Charles Speyrer | 8 rec, 160 yards, 1 TD |

=== Vs. Rice ===
Rice Owls (1–3) vs. Texas Longhorns (4–0)

| Quarter | 1 | 2 | 3 | 4 | Total |
|---|---|---|---|---|---|
| Rice | 0 | 0 | 0 | 0 | 0 |
| No. 2 Texas | 7 | 14 | 7 | 3 | 31 |

at Memorial Stadium • Austin, TX

- Date: Saturday, October 25, 1969
- Game time: 1:30 PM CDT
- Game weather: Clear, 74 °F (23 °C)
- Game attendance: 61,500
- Box Score

Game information

First Quarter

- (3:24) UT – Steve Worster 2 yard run (Feller kick), UT 7–0; 4 plays, 32 yards, 1:18

Second Quarter

- (9:10) UT – Jim Bertelsen 4 yard run (Feller kick), UT 14–0; 1 play, 4 yards, 0:06
- (2:02) UT – Billy Dale 4 yard run (Feller kick), UT 21–0; 6 plays, 46 yards, 1:23

Third Quarter

- (10:24) UT – Billy Dale 1 yard run (Feller kick), UT 28–0; 12 plays, 71 yards, 4:36

Fourth Quarter

- (14:18) UT – Happy Feller 24 yard field goal, UT 31–0; 4 plays, 4 yards, 1:36

| Statistics | RICE | TEX |
|---|---|---|
| First downs | 11 | 20 |
| Total yards | 138 | 447 |
| Rushes/yards | 43/47 | 64/291 |
| Passing yards | 91 | 156 |
| Passing: Comp–Att–Int | 9–29–3 | 9–16–1 |
| Time of possession | | |

| Team | Category | Player | Statistics |
|---|---|---|---|
| Rice | Passing | TEAM | 9–29, 91 yards, 3 INTs |
| Rice | Rushing | TEAM | 43 car, 47 yards |
| Rice | Receiving | TEAM | 9 rec, 91 yards |
| Texas | Passing | James Street | 6–10, 94 yards |
| Texas | Rushing | Steve Worster | 16 car, 57 yards, 1 TD |
| Texas | Receiving | Charles Speyrer | 3 rec, 38 yards |

=== At SMU ===
Texas Longhorns (5–0) vs. SMU Mustangs (2–4)

| Quarter | 1 | 2 | 3 | 4 | Total |
|---|---|---|---|---|---|
| No. 2 Texas | 7 | 3 | 21 | 14 | 45 |
| SMU | 0 | 3 | 3 | 8 | 14 |

at Cotton Bowl • Dallas, TX

- Date: Saturday, November 1, 1969
- Game time: 1:00 PM CDT
- Game weather: Calm, 54 °F (12 °C)
- Game attendance: 55,287
- Box Score

Game information

First Quarter

- (10:04) UT – Jim Bertelsen 7 yard run (Feller kick), UT 7–0; 12 plays, 80 yards, 4:53

Second Quarter

- (4:42) SMU – Johnson 32 yard field goal, UT 7–3; 9 plays, 46 yards, 4:06
- (0:11) UT – Happy Feller 32 yard field goal, UT 10–3; 7 plays, 27 yards, 1:17

Third Quarter

- (8:13) SMU – Johnson 17 yard field goal, UT 10–6; 15 plays, 80 yards, 6:42
- (5:16) UT – Steve Worster 1 yard run (Feller kick), UT 17–6; 8 plays, 67 yards, 2:52
- (3:34) UT – Jim Bertelsen 26 yard run (Feller kick), UT 24–6; 2 plays, 35 yards, 0:26
- (1:05) UT – Ted Koy 40 yard run (Feller kick), UT 31–6; 4 plays, 68 yards, 1:26

Fourth Quarter

- (13:42) UT – Jim Bertelsen 3 yard run (Feller kick), UT 38–6; 8 plays, 57 yards, 1:35
- (10:48) SMU – Lesser 29 yard pass from Chuck Hixson (Hixson run), UT 38–14; 9 plays, 69 yards, 2:50
- (6:51) UT – Jim Bertelsen 13 yard run (Feller kick), UT 45–14; 12 plays, 80 yards, 3:57

| Statistics | TEX | SMU |
|---|---|---|
| First downs | 34 | 15 |
| Total yards | 676 | 296 |
| Rushes/yards | 80/611 | 35/73 |
| Passing yards | 65 | 223 |
| Passing: Comp–Att–Int | 4–10–0 | 20–38–2 |
| Time of possession | | |

| Team | Category | Player | Statistics |
|---|---|---|---|
| Texas | Passing | James Street | 4–10, 65 yards |
| Texas | Rushing | Steve Worster | 21 car, 137 yards, 1 TD |
| Texas | Receiving | Charles Speyrer | 3 rec, 56 yards |
| SMU | Passing | TEAM | 20–38, 223 yards, 1 TD, 2 INTs |
| SMU | Rushing | TEAM | 35 car, 73 yards |
| SMU | Receiving | TEAM | 20 rec, 223 yards, 1 TD |

=== Vs. Baylor ===
Baylor Bears (0–6) vs. Texas Longhorns (6–0)

| Quarter | 1 | 2 | 3 | 4 | Total |
|---|---|---|---|---|---|
| Baylor | 0 | 7 | 0 | 7 | 14 |
| No. 2 Texas | 21 | 21 | 14 | 0 | 56 |

at Memorial Stadium • Austin, TX

- Date: Saturday, November 8, 1969
- Game time: 2:00 PM CDT
- Game weather: Clear, 84 °F (29 °C)
- Game attendance: 55,000
- Box Score

Game information

First Quarter

- (10:16) UT – Bobby Callison 1 yard run (Feller kick), UT 7–0; 6 plays, 80 yards, 2:15
- (6:04) UT – Charles Spreyer 20 yard pass from James Street (Feller kick), UT 14–0; 6 plays, 51 yards, 2:34
- (4:01) UT – Bobby Callison 1 yard run (Feller kick), UT 21–0; 5 plays, 14 yards, 1:51

Second Quarter

- (12:54) UT – Ted Koy 6 yard run (Feller kick), UT 28–0; 9 plays, 80 yards, 3:06
- (8:38) UT – Bobby Callison 37 yard run (Feller kick), UT 35–0; 6 plays, 65 yards, 1:47
- (6:33) UT – Eddie Phillips 8 yard run (Layne kick), UT 42–0; 6 plays, 27 yards, 1:27
- (4:03) BAY – Utgard 1 yard run (Cozby kick), UT 42–7; 9 plays, 72 yards, 2:30

Third Quarter

- (10:26) UT – Terry Collins 1 yard run (Layne kick), UT 49–7; 9 plays, 50 yards, 3:23
- (6:23) UT – Eddie Phillips 10 yard run (Layne kick), UT 56–7; 6 plays, 67 yards, 2:48

Fourth Quarter

- (2:11) BAY – Utgard 1 yard run (Cozvy kick), UT 56–14; 14 plays, 64 yards, 5:22

| Statistics | BAY | TEX |
|---|---|---|
| First downs | 12 | 31 |
| Total yards | 203 | 555 |
| Rushes/yards | 38/93 | 67/388 |
| Passing yards | 110 | 167 |
| Passing: Comp–Att–Int | 8–27–5 | 12–23–0 |
| Time of possession | | |

| Team | Category | Player | Statistics |
|---|---|---|---|
| Baylor | Passing | TEAM | 8–27, 110 yards, 5 INTs |
| Baylor | Rushing | TEAM | 38 car, 93 yards, 2 TDs |
| Baylor | Receiving | TEAM | 8 rec, 110 yards |
| Texas | Passing | Eddie Phillips | 5–10, 55 yards |
| Texas | Rushing | Jim Bertelsen | 4 car, 80 yards |
| Texas | Receiving | Randy Peschel | 5 rec, 61 yards |

=== Vs. TCU ===
TCU Horned Frogs (3–5) vs. Texas Longhorns (7–0)

| Quarter | 1 | 2 | 3 | 4 | Total |
|---|---|---|---|---|---|
| TCU | 0 | 7 | 0 | 0 | 7 |
| No. 2 Texas | 21 | 13 | 7 | 28 | 69 |

at Memorial Stadium • Austin, TX

- Date: Saturday, November 15, 1969
- Game time: 2:00 PM CDT
- Game weather: Clear, 63 °F (17 °C)
- Game attendance: 51,000
- Box Score

Game information

First Quarter

- (10:22) UT – Jim Bertelsen 3 yard run (Feller kick), UT 7–0; 5 plays, 26 yards, 1:52
- (7:19) UT – Steve Worster 34 yard run (Feller kick), UT 14–0; 5 plays, 64 yards, 1:55
- (2:08) UT – James Street 10 yard run (Feller kick), UT 21–0; 10 plays, 43 yards, 3:55

Second Quarter

- (9:02) TCU – Cole 65 yard punt return (Merritt kick), UT 21–7
- (1:54) UT – Steve Worster 1 yard run (Feller kick), UT 28–7; 12 plays, 80 yards, 3:11
- (0:43) UT – Charles Spreyer 18 yard pass from James Street (kick failed), UT 34–7; 3 plays, 41 yards, 0:43

Third Quarter

- (12:35) UT – Billy Dale 51 yard run (Feller kick), UT 41–7; 7 plays, 80 yards, 2:25

Fourth Quarter

- (14:08) UT – Ken Ehrig 51 yard pass from Eddie Phillips (Layne kick), UT 48–7; 5 plays, 78 yards, 2:13
- (8:27) UT – Donnie Wigginton 5 yard run (Layne kick), UT 55–7; 5 plays, 68 yards, 1:16
- (5:15) UT – Donnie Wigginton 6 yard run (Layne kick), UT 62–7; 4 plays, 30 yards, 1:18
- (3:46) UT – Tommy Asaff 1 yard run (Layne kick), UT 69–7; 4 plays, 26 yards, 1:11

| Statistics | TCU | TEX |
|---|---|---|
| First downs | 12 | 32 |
| Total yards | 181 | 651 |
| Rushes/yards | 37/105 | 80/517 |
| Passing yards | 76 | 134 |
| Passing: Comp–Att–Int | 9–34–3 | 8–15–2 |
| Time of possession | | |

| Team | Category | Player | Statistics |
|---|---|---|---|
| TCU | Passing | TEAM | 9–34, 76 yards, 3 INTs |
| TCU | Rushing | TEAM | 37 car, 105 yards |
| TCU | Receiving | TEAM | 9 rec, 76 yards |
| Texas | Passing | James Street | 5–8, 54 yards, 1 TD, 1 INT |
| Texas | Rushing | Jim Bertelsen | 16 car, 104 yards, 1 TD |
| Texas | Receiving | Ken Ehrig | 4 rec, 89 yards, 1 TD |

=== At Texas A&M ===
Texas Longhorns (8–0) vs. Texas A&M Aggies (3–6)

| Quarter | 1 | 2 | 3 | 4 | Total |
|---|---|---|---|---|---|
| No. 1 Texas | 13 | 26 | 3 | 7 | 49 |
| Texas A&M | 0 | 0 | 0 | 12 | 12 |

at Kyle Field • College Station, TX

- Date: Thursday, November 27, 1969
- Game time: 1:00 PM CDT
- Game weather: Light Drizzle, 58 °F (14 °C)
- Game attendance: 51,160
- Box Score

Game information

First Quarter

- (13:27) UT – Jim Bertelsen 63 yard run (Feller kick), UT 7–0; 4 plays, 80 yards, 1:33
- (7:05) UT – Steve Worster 2 yard run (kick failed), UT 13–0; 13 plays, 81 yards, 4:42

Second Quarter

- (13:34) UT – Steve Worster 8 yard run (Feller kick), UT 20–0; 7 plays, 46 yards
- (10:58) UT – James Street 8 yard run (Feller kick), UT 27–0; 4 plays, 52 yards
- (7:26) UT – Jim Bertelsen 7 yard run (kick failed), UT 33–0; 2 plays, 4 yards
- (4:50) UT – Randy Peschel 37 yard pass from Charles Speyrer (kick failed), UT 39–0; 1 play, 37 yards

Third Quarter

- (4:42) UT – Happy Feller 43 yard field goal, UT 42–0; 9 plays, 14 yards

Fourth Quarter

- (7:52) A&M – Brupbacher 2 yard pass from Self (pass failed), UT 42–6; 6 plays, 27 yards
- (6:35) A&M – Piper 4 yard blocked punt return (pass failed), UT 42–12
- (0:19) UT – Eddie Phillips 4 yard run (Feller kick), UT 49–12; 14 plays, 45 yards

| Statistics | TEX | TAMU |
|---|---|---|
| First downs | 22 | 12 |
| Total yards | 441 | 155 |
| Rushes/yards | 68/330 | 52/88 |
| Passing yards | 111 | 67 |
| Passing: Comp–Att–Int | 6–14–1 | 6–18–4 |
| Time of possession | | |

| Team | Category | Player | Statistics |
|---|---|---|---|
| Texas | Passing | Eddie Phillips | 3–8, 31 yards |
| Texas | Rushing | Jim Bertelsen | 9 car, 92 yards, 2 TDs |
| Texas | Receiving | Charles Speyrer | 2 rec, 43 yards |
| Texas A&M | Passing | TEAM | 6–18, 67 yards, 1 TD, 4 INTs |
| Texas A&M | Rushing | TEAM | 52 car, 88 yards |
| Texas A&M | Receiving | TEAM | 6 rec, 67 yards, 1 TD |

=== At Arkansas ===
Texas Longhorns (9–0) vs. Arkansas Razorbacks (9–0)

| Quarter | 1 | 2 | 3 | 4 | Total |
|---|---|---|---|---|---|
| No. 1 Texas | 0 | 0 | 0 | 15 | 15 |
| No. 2 Arkansas | 7 | 0 | 7 | 0 | 14 |

at Razorback Stadium • Fayetteville, AR

- Date: Saturday, December 6, 1969
- Game time: 12:00 PM CDT
- Game weather: Overcast with Rain, 38 °F (3 °C)
- Game attendance: 47,500
- Referee: Carl Landiss
- TV announcers (ABC): Chris Schenkel, Bud Wilkinson
- Box Score

Game information

First Quarter

- (13:33) ARK – Bill Burnett 1 yard run (McClard kick), ARK 7–0; 5 plays, 22 yards, 0:57

Third Quarter

- (9:06) ARK – Chuck Dicus 29 yard pass from Bill Montgomery (McClard kick), ARK 14–0; 5 plays, 53 yards, 1:38

Fourth Quarter

- (14:47) UT – James Street 42 yard run (Street run), ARK 14–8; 9 plays, 80 yards, 3:37
- (3:58) UT – Jim Bertelsen 2 yard run (Feller kick), UT 15–14; 6 plays, 64 yards, 2:12

| Statistics | TEX | ARK |
|---|---|---|
| First downs | 19 | 18 |
| Total yards | 368 | 308 |
| Rushes/yards | 60/244 | 44/103 |
| Passing yards | 124 | 205 |
| Passing: Comp–Att–Int | 6–10–2 | 14–22–2 |
| Time of possession | | |

| Team | Category | Player | Statistics |
|---|---|---|---|
| Texas | Passing | James Street | 6–10, 124 yards, 2 INTs |
| Texas | Rushing | Steve Worster | 25 car, 94 yards |
| Texas | Receiving | Cotton Speyrer | 4 rec, 65 yards |
| Arkansas | Passing | Bill Montgomery | 14–22, 205 yards, 1 TD, 2 INTs |
| Arkansas | Rushing | TEAM | 44 car, 103 yards, 1 TD |
| Arkansas | Receiving | TEAM | 14 rec, 205 yards, 1 TD |

With two legendary coaches (Broyles and Royal), two neighboring states, two football powerhouses (8 of last 10 SWC Championships), and two recent National Championships (Arkansas in 1964 and Texas in 1963), Arkansas and Texas had developed a rivalry. The game was moved from the usual third week in October to the first week in December so it could be televised nationally on ABC. President Richard Nixon attended the game, and AstroTurf was even installed in Razorback Stadium in preparation for the game.

Arkansas' top-rated defense was going up against the #1-rated Texas offense, but the Hogs got on top early, with a 1-yard TD run by Bill Burnett. After halftime, Chuck Dicus hauled in a 29-yard touchdown pass, giving the Razorbacks a 14–0 lead heading into the game's final quarter. Longhorn QB James Street then led his squad to its first touchdown, and as coach Darrell Royal had planned, Texas attempted and completed the two-point conversion, which would in all likelihood prevent a tie.

Arkansas then had the ball and the lead, and a 73-yard drive later, the Hogs were in good position to tack on a field goal that would put the game out of reach, but Razorback QB Bill Montgomery was intercepted in the end zone, giving the Longhorns new life. The Texas drive appeared stalled at the Longhorns' own 43, on a 4th and 3, when Royal gambled again. A 44-yard pass to Randy Peschel, who caught the ball in double coverage, put Texas at the Arkansas 13. Longhorn RB Jim Bertelsen would run in for the tying six points. The extra-point snap was high, but was snared by third-string QB Donnie Wigginton and the kick was converted by Longhorn kicker Happy Feller, giving Texas a 15–14 lead with 3:58 to play.

Arkansas drove to the Texas 40, looking for a field goal from All-American kicker Bill McClard, but the turnover bug struck again as Montgomery was again picked off.

=== Vs. Notre Dame (Cotton Bowl) ===
1970 Cotton Bowl Classic: Notre Dame Fighting Irish (8–1–1) vs. Texas Longhorns (10–0)

| Quarter | 1 | 2 | 3 | 4 | Total |
|---|---|---|---|---|---|
| No. 9 Notre Dame | 3 | 7 | 0 | 7 | 17 |
| No. 1 Texas | 0 | 7 | 0 | 14 | 21 |

at Cotton Bowl • Dallas, TX

- Date: Thursday, January 1, 1970
- Game time: 1:00 PM CDT
- Game weather: Clear, 48 °F (9 °C)
- Game attendance: 71,938
- Referee: Cliff Domingue
- TV announcers (CBS): Lindsey Nelson, Tom Brookshier
- Box Score

Game information

First Quarter

- (8:41) ND – Scott Hempel 26 yard field goal, ND 3–0; 16 plays, 82 yards, 6:14

Second Quarter

- (14:40) ND – Tom Gatewood 54 yard pass from Joe Theismann (Hempel kick), ND 10–0; 1 play, 54 yards, 0:08
- (11:12) UT – Jim Bertelsen 1 yard run (Feller kick), ND 10–7; 9 plays, 74 yards, 3:22

Fourth Quarter

- (10:05) UT – Ted Koy 3 yard run (Feller kick), UT 14–10; 18 plays, 77 yards, 6:10
- (6:52) ND – Jim Yoden 24 yard pass from Joe Theismann (Hempel kick), ND 17–14; 8 plays, 80 yards, 2:56
- (1:08) UT – Billy Dale 1 yard run (Feller kick), UT 21–17; 17 plays, 76 yards, 5:39

| Statistics | ND | TEX |
|---|---|---|
| First downs | 25 | 25 |
| Total yards | 420 | 438 |
| Rushes/yards | 43/189 | 67/331 |
| Passing yards | 231 | 107 |
| Passing: Comp–Att–Int | 17–27–2 | 6–11–1 |
| Time of possession | | |

| Team | Category | Player | Statistics |
|---|---|---|---|
| Notre Dame | Passing | Joe Theismann | 17–27, 231 yards, 2 TDs, 2 INTs |
| Notre Dame | Rushing | Bill Barz | 10 car, 49 yards |
| Notre Dame | Receiving | Tom Gatewood | 6 rec, 112 yards, 1 TD |
| Texas | Passing | James Street | 6–11, 107 yards, 1 INT |
| Texas | Rushing | Steve Worster | 20 car, 155 yards |
| Texas | Receiving | Charles Speyrer | 4 rec, 70 yards |

== Personnel ==
=== Roster ===
1969 Texas Longhorns football team roster
Players
Coaches
Offense

| Pos. | # | Name | Class |
|---|---|---|---|
| C | 57 | Jim Achilles | So |
| HB | 27 | Tommy Asaff | Sr |
| HB | | David Ballew | So |
| OT | | Andy Banks | So |
| HB | 35 | Jim Bertelsen | So |
| G | | Bolton Jerrell | So |
| FB | 46 | Bobby Callison | Jr |
| HB | | Bill Catlett | So |
| HB | 33 | Terry Collins | Jr |
| TE | 83 | Deryl Comer | Sr |
| TE | 38 | Jay Cormier | So |
| G | 75 | Charles Crawford | So |
| HB | 22 | Billy Dale | Jr |
| G | 66 | Mike Dean | Jr |
| WR | 45 | Ken Ehrig | Sr |
| FB | 15 | Tim Horn | Sr |
| E | | James Hull | So |
| HB | | Kevin Hutson | So |
| HB | 21 | Dickie Johnston | Sr |
| G | 60 | Syd Keasler | So |
| HB | | David Keeton | So |
| HB | 24 | Ted Koy | Sr |
| HB | 19 | Paul Kristynik | Sr |
| HB | | Sam Lawless | So |
| HB | 23 | Tommy Lee | Jr |
| OT | | Sam McBriety | So |
| C | | George McIngvale | So |
| OT | 62 | Bob McKay | Sr |
| G | 64 | Bobby Mitchell | Jr |
| HB | 41 | Rick Nabors | Jr |
| HB | | Robert Paine | So |
| OT | 65 | Scott Palmer | Jr |
| E | 10 | Robbie Patman | Sr |
| QB | 14 | Eddie Phillips | So |
| TE | 40 | Randy Peschel | Sr |
| HB | 17 | Gary Rike | Sr |
| HB | 47 | Paul Robichau | So |
| HB | 26 | Johnny Robinson | Jr |
| G | | Charles Rogers | So |
| G | | Mike Speer | So |
| WR | 88 | Cotton Speyrer | Jr |
| G | | Rod Squires | So |
| G | 74 | Randy Stout | So |
| QB | 16 | James Street | Sr |
| OT | | Ronnie Tyler | So |
| QB | | John Ulrich | So |
| C | 52 | Forrest Wiegand | Sr |
| QB | 18 | Donnie Wigginton | So |
| HB | | Donny Windham | So |
| FB | 30 | Steve Worster | Jr |
| OT | 50 | Bobby Wuensch | Jr |
| C | | Jeff Zapalac | So |

Defense

| Pos. | # | Name | Class |
|---|---|---|---|
| DE | 89 | David Arledge | So |
| DE | 77 | Bill Atessis | Jr |
| DE | 49 | Glen Booher | Sr |
| DT | 71 | Leo Brooks | Sr |
| LB | 86 | Mike Campbell | Sr |
| CB | 84 | Tom Campbell | Sr |
| DT | 63 | George Cobb | Sr |
| DT | 69 | Glen Frantzen | Sr |
| LB | 44 | Raymond Fontenot | Jr |
| LB | 13 | Jimmy Gunn | So |
| LB | 67 | Glenn Halsell | Sr |
| LB | 61 | Scott Henderson | Jr |
| LB | | Buddy Hudgins | So |
| DT | | Bob Huffman | So |
| LB | 32 | Mike Hutchings | Sr |
| LB | | Wayne Kirk | So |
| DB | | Danny Lester | So |
| DT | 79 | Pat Macha | So |
| LB | | Rick Martin | So |
| DT | | Tommy Matula | So |
| DE | 85 | Stan Mauldin | So |
| LB | 42 | Mack McKinney | Sr |
| S | 20 | Scooter Monzingo | Sr |
| LB | | Johnny Otahal | So |
| DT | 31 | Greg Ploetz | Jr |
| LB | 34 | David Richardson | Jr |
| DT | 73 | Travis Roach | So |
| LB | | Jack Rushing | So |
| DT | | Rob Schultz | So |
| S | 28 | Freddie Steinmark | Jr |
| LB | | Dan Terwelp | So |
| LB | | Rick Troberman | So |
| LB | 68 | Larry Webb | So |
| DT | 70 | Carl White | So |
| DE | 72 | Jim Williamson | Sr |
| LB | 82 | Tommy Woodward | So |
| DT | 76 | Chris Young | Sr |
| DE | 80 | Bill Zapalac | Jr |

Special teams

| Pos. | # | Name | Class |
|---|---|---|---|
| K | 5 | Happy Feller | Jr |
| K | 37 | Rob Layne | Sr |

Head coach

- Darrell Royal

Coordinators/assistant coaches

- Fred Akers
  Emory Bellard
  Mike Campbell
  Leon Manley
  Pat Patterson
  Willie Zapalac

Legend

- (C) Team captain
- (S) Suspended
- (I) Ineligible
- Injured
- Redshirt

=== Depth chart ===
Defense

S
Fred Steinmark
Scooter Monzingo
⋅

| ROLB | MLB | MLB | LOLB |
|---|---|---|---|
| Mike Campbell | Glen Halsell | Scott Henderson | David Richardson |
| Mike Hutchings | Mack McKinney | Raymond Fontenot | Rick Troberman |
| ⋅ | ⋅ | ⋅ | ⋅ |

CB
Tom Campbell
⋅
⋅

| DE | DT | DT | DE |
|---|---|---|---|
| Bill Atessis | Leo Brooks | Greg Ploetz | Bill Zapalac |
| David Arledge | Carl White | Chris Young | Jim Williamson |
| ⋅ | ⋅ | ⋅ | ⋅ |

CB
Danny Lester
⋅
⋅

Offense

TE
Randy Peschel
⋅
⋅

| LT | LG | C | RG | RT |
|---|---|---|---|---|
| Bobby Wuensch | Randy Stout | Forrest Wiegand | Mike Dean | Bob McKay |
| Scott Palmer | Bobby Mitchell | Jim Achilles | ⋅ | ⋅ |
| ⋅ | ⋅ | ⋅ | ⋅ | ⋅ |

WR
Cotton Speyrer
Ken Ehrig
⋅

QB
James Street
Eddie Phillips
Donnie Wigginton

FB
Steve Worster
Bobby Callison
⋅

Special teams
PK Happy Feller
P Scooter Monzingo
KR Cotton Speyrer
PR Fred Steinmark
LS ---

RB
Jim Bertelsen
Terry Collins
⋅

RB
Ted Koy
Billy Dale
⋅

== Awards and honors ==
- Bob McKay, tackle, Consensus All-American

== NFL draft ==
Three seniors from the 1969 Longhorns were selected in the 1970 NFL draft:

| Player | Position | Round | Pick | Franchise |
|---|---|---|---|---|
| Bob McKay | T | 1 | 21 | Cleveland Browns |
| Leo Brooks | DT | 2 | 31 | Houston Oilers |
| Ted Koy | RB | 2 | 50 | Oakland Raiders |

Nine juniors from the 1969 Longhorns were selected in the 1971 NFL draft:

| Player | Position | Round | Pick | Franchise |
|---|---|---|---|---|
| Cotton Speyrer | WR | 2 | 38 | Washington Redskins |
| Bill Atessis | DE | 2 | 52 | Baltimore Colts |
| Happy Feller | K | 4 | 83 | Philadelphia Eagles |
| Bill Zapalac | LB | 4 | 84 | New York Jets |
| Steve Worster | RB | 4 | 90 | Los Angeles Rams |
| Scott Palmer | DT | 7 | 162 | New York Jets |
| Bobby Wuensch | T | 12 | 294 | Baltimore Colts |
| Danny Lester | DB | 13 | 317 | Philadelphia Eagles |
| Deryl Comer | TE | 14 | 345 | Atlanta Falcons |

Two sophomores from the 1969 Longhorns were selected in the 1972 NFL draft:

| Player | Position | Round | Pick | Franchise |
|---|---|---|---|---|
| Jim Bertelsen | RB | 2 | 30 | Los Angeles Rams |
| Eddie Phillips | QB | 4 | 95 | Los Angeles Rams |
