= Arkansas–Texas football rivalry =

American college football rivalry

Hogs vs. Horns
- Arkansas Razorbacks Texas Longhorns
- First meeting: November 29, 1894; Texas 54, Arkansas 0
- Latest meeting: November 21, 2026; Texas 45, Arkansas 3
- Next meeting: 2027

Statistics
- Total meetings: 82
- All-time series: Texas leads, 59–23 (.720)
- Largest victory: Texas, 54–0 (1894)
- Longest win streak: Texas, 14 (1894–1932)
- Current win streak: Texas, 3 (2024–present)

Locations of Arkansas and Texas

2026: Junior left-handed quarterback KJ Jackson throws a pass for the Arkansas Razorbacks against the Texas Longhorns

The Arkansas–Texas football rivalry is an American college football rivalry between the Arkansas Razorbacks and Texas Longhorns.

== History ==
Texas and Arkansas first met in 1894 in a 54–0 victory by Texas. The two programs have met 80 times and have played many historically notable games, such as the 1964 game in Austin that led to Arkansas's 1964 national title, the 1969 Game of the Century in Fayetteville between #2 Arkansas and #1 Texas, which eventually led to Texas's 1969 national title, the 1981 game in Fayetteville that is the largest margin of victory for an unranked team over the top-ranked team in college football since World War II when Arkansas beat #1 Texas 42–11, and the first game of the 21st century, when Arkansas beat Texas 27–6 in the 2000 Cotton Bowl. Although they did not regularly play each other after Arkansas's move to the Southeastern Conference in 1991, which consequently sent Texas to the Big XII Conference in 1996, many Arkansas fans considered this an important rivalry even before Texas' later move to the SEC which brought the regular game back. Texas and Arkansas met in the 2014 Texas Bowl, which Arkansas won 31–7. The two teams renewed the rivalry on September 11, 2021, at Fayetteville with Arkansas winning the "welcome to the SEC" game 40–21. In Texas' actual SEC debut they beat the Hogs 20-10 at Razorback stadium on November 16, 2024.

Texas leads the series 59–23. The rivalry resumed on a permanent basis when Texas joined the Southeastern Conference in the 2024 season. The Longhorns visited Fayetteville in their first year as a member of the SEC. The rivalry will continue to be on a permanent basis as the SEC announced 9-game conference schedule in 2025. Each will have three permanent opponents; Arkansas and Texas will play each every year from 2026 to 2029.

== Game results ==
Arkansas victories	Texas victories	Tie games

No.	Date	Location	Winning team		Losing team	
1	November 29, 1894	Austin	Texas	54	Arkansas	0
2	October 29, 1903	Austin	Texas	15	Arkansas	0
3	October 31, 1905	Fayetteville	Texas	4	Arkansas	0
4	October 30, 1906	Fayetteville	Texas	11	Arkansas	0
5	October 30, 1907	Fayetteville	Texas	26	Arkansas	6
6	November 5, 1908	Austin	Texas	21	Arkansas	0
7	October 28, 1911	Austin	Texas	12	Arkansas	0
8	November 28, 1912	Austin	Texas	48	Arkansas	0
9	November 14, 1916	Austin	Texas	52	Arkansas	0
10	November 29, 1917	Austin	Texas	20	Arkansas	0
11	November 8, 1919	Austin	Texas	35	Arkansas	7
12	October 20, 1928	Austin	Texas	20	Arkansas	7
13	October 12, 1929	Fayetteville	Texas	27	Arkansas	0
14	November 18, 1932	Fayetteville	Texas	34	Arkansas	0
15	November 24, 1933	Austin	Arkansas	20	Texas	6
16	November 23, 1934	Fayetteville	Texas	19	Arkansas	12
17	November 22, 1935	Austin	Arkansas	28	Texas	13
18	December 5, 1936	Little Rock	Arkansas	6	Texas	0
19	October 16, 1937	Austin	Arkansas	21	Texas	10
20	October 15, 1938	Little Rock	Arkansas	42	Texas	6
21	October 21, 1939	Austin	Texas	14	Arkansas	13
22	October 19, 1940	Little Rock	No. 14 Texas	21	Arkansas	0
23	October 18, 1941	Austin	No. 2 Texas	48	Arkansas	14
24	October 17, 1942	Little Rock	No. 20 Texas	47	Arkansas	6
25	October 16, 1943	Austin	Texas	34	Arkansas	0
26	October 21, 1944	Little Rock	Texas	19	Arkansas	0
27	October 20, 1945	Little Rock	Texas	34	Arkansas	7
28	October 19, 1946	Austin	No. 3 Texas	20	No. 14 Arkansas	0
29	October 18, 1947	Memphis	No. 3 Texas	21	Arkansas	6
30	October 16, 1948	Austin	Texas	14	Arkansas	6
31	October 15, 1949	Little Rock	No. 16 Texas	27	Arkansas	14
32	October 21, 1950	Austin	Texas	19	Arkansas	14
33	October 20, 1951	Fayetteville	Arkansas	16	Texas	14
34	October 18, 1952	Austin	Texas	44	Arkansas	7
35	October 17, 1953	Fayetteville	Texas	16	Arkansas	7
36	October 16, 1954	Austin	No. 12 Arkansas	20	Texas	7
37	October 15, 1955	Little Rock	Arkansas	27	Texas	20
38	October 20, 1956	Austin	Arkansas	32	Texas	14
39	October 19, 1957	Fayetteville	Texas	17	No. 10 Arkansas	0
40	October 18, 1958	Austin	No. 7 Texas	24	Arkansas	6
41	October 17, 1959	Little Rock	No. 3 Texas	13	No. 12 Arkansas	12
42	October 15, 1960	Austin	Arkansas	24	No. 11 Texas	23

No.	Date	Location	Winning team		Losing team	
43	October 21, 1961	Fayetteville	No. 3 Texas	33	No. 10 Arkansas	7
44	October 20, 1962	Austin	No. 1 Texas	7	No. 7 Arkansas	3
45	October 19, 1963	Little Rock	No. 1 Texas	17	Arkansas	13
46	October 17, 1964	Austin	No. 9 Arkansas	14	No. 1 Texas	13
47	October 16, 1965	Fayetteville	No. 3 Arkansas	27	No. 1 Texas	24
48	October 15, 1966	Austin	Arkansas	12	Texas	7
49	October 21, 1967	Little Rock	Texas	21	Arkansas	12
50	October 19, 1968	Austin	No. 17 Texas	39	No. 9 Arkansas	29
51	December 6, 1969	Fayetteville	No. 1 Texas	15	No. 2 Arkansas	14
52	December 5, 1970	Austin	No. 1 Texas	42	No. 4 Arkansas	7
53	October 16, 1971	Little Rock	No. 16 Arkansas	31	No. 10 Texas	7
54	October 21, 1972	Austin	No. 14 Texas	35	No. 17 Arkansas	15
55	October 20, 1973	Fayetteville	Texas	34	Arkansas	6
56	October 19, 1974	Austin	No. 16 Texas	38	Arkansas	7
57	October 18, 1975	Fayetteville	No. 8 Texas	24	No. 20 Arkansas	18
58	December 4, 1976	Austin	Texas	29	Arkansas	12
59	October 15, 1977	Fayetteville	No. 2 Texas	13	No. 8 Arkansas	9
60	October 21, 1978	Austin	No. 8 Texas	28	No. 3 Arkansas	21
61	October 20, 1979	Little Rock	No. 10 Arkansas	17	No. 2 Texas	14
62	September 1, 1980	Austin	No. 10 Texas	23	No. 6 Arkansas	17
63	October 17, 1981	Fayetteville	Arkansas	42	No. 1 Texas	11
64	December 4, 1982	Austin	No. 12 Texas	33	No. 6 Arkansas	7
65	October 15, 1983	Little Rock	No. 2 Texas	31	Arkansas	3
66	October 20, 1984	Austin	No. 3 Texas	24	Arkansas	18
67	October 19, 1985	Fayetteville	Texas	15	No. 4 Arkansas	13
68	October 18, 1986	Austin	Arkansas	21	Texas	14
69	October 17, 1987	Little Rock	Texas	16	No. 15 Arkansas	14
70	October 15, 1988	Austin	No. 6 Arkansas	27	No. 25 Texas	24
71	October 21, 1989	Fayetteville	No. 24 Texas	24	No. 7 Arkansas	20
72	October 20, 1990	Austin	No. 19 Texas	49	Arkansas	17
73	October 19, 1991	Little Rock	Arkansas	14	Texas	13
74	January 1, 2000	Dallas	No. 24 Arkansas	27	No. 14 Texas	6
75	September 13, 2003	Austin	Arkansas	38	No. 6 Texas	28
76	September 11, 2004	Fayetteville	No. 7 Texas	22	Arkansas	20
77	September 27, 2008	Austin	No. 7 Texas	52	Arkansas	10
78	December 29, 2014	Houston	Arkansas	31	Texas	7
79	September 11, 2021	Fayetteville	Arkansas	40	No. 15 Texas	21
80	November 16, 2024	Fayetteville	No. 3 Texas	20	Arkansas	10
81	November 22, 2025	Austin	No. 17 Texas	52	Arkansas	37
82	November 21, 2026	Austin	No. 5 Texas	45	Arkansas	3
Series: Texas leads 59–23

=== Results by location ===
As of November 21, 2026

City	Games	Texas victories	Arkansas victories
Austin	41	29	12
Dallas	1	0	1
Fayetteville	22	18	4
Houston	1	0	1
Little Rock	16	10	6
Memphis	1	1	0

== See also ==
- List of NCAA college football rivalry games
