= 1970 Cotton Bowl Classic =

- 34th Cotton Bowl Classic
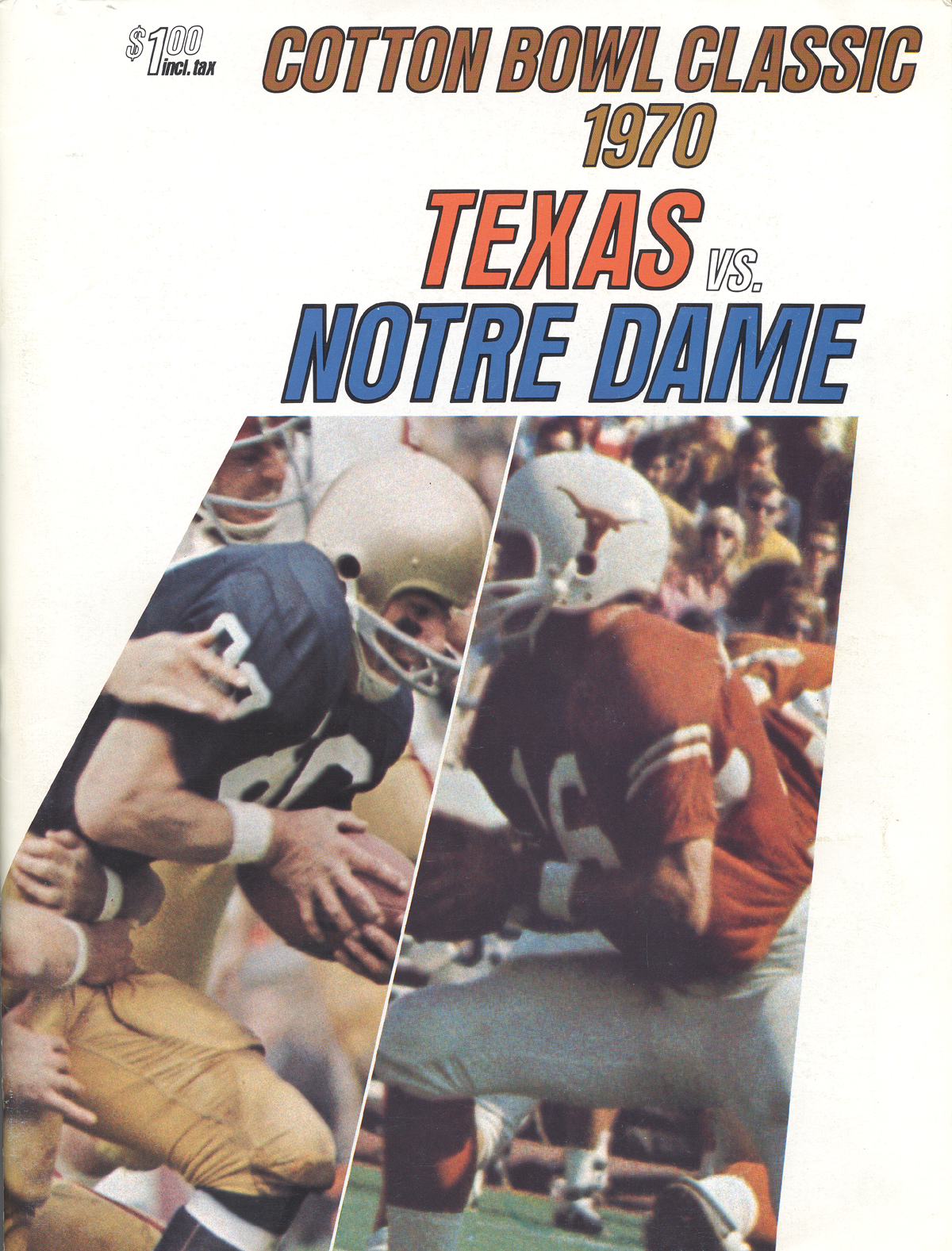
Texas Longhorns	Notre Dame Fighting Irish
(10–0)	(8–1–1)
SWC	Independent
21	17
Head coach: Darrell Royal	Head coach: Ara Parseghian
AP / Coaches; 1 / 1	AP / Coaches; 9 / 9
	1	2	3	4	Total
Texas	0	7	0	14	21
Notre Dame	3	7	0	7	17
- Date: January 1, 1970
- Season: 1969
- Stadium: Cotton Bowl
- Location: Dallas, Texas
- MVP: Steve Worster, FB, Texas; Bob Olson, LB, Notre Dame
- Favorite: Texas by 7
- Referee: Cliff Domingue (SWC) (split crew: SWC, Big Ten)
- Attendance: 71,938

United States TV coverage
- Network: CBS
- Announcers: Lindsey Nelson, Tom Brookshier

The Cotton Bowl in Dallas, Texas, hosted the Cotton Bowl Classic.

The 1970 Cotton Bowl Classic was a postseason college football bowl game in the 1969 season, held at the Cotton Bowl in Dallas, Texas, on Thursday, January 1, 1970. The game matched the top-ranked Texas Longhorns (10–0) and the #9 Notre Dame Fighting Irish (8–1–1).

== Background ==
Texas was looking to win its second unanimous national championship in seven seasons, previously won in 1963. The Longhorns, who had already won the national championship of the UPI coaches poll prior to the Cotton Bowl, finished with a perfect season and a second straight Southwest Conference championship. The Associated Press would conduct a final poll following the bowl games.

This was independent Notre Dame's first postseason appearance since the 1925 Rose Bowl, 45 years earlier.

By a vote of its players in mid-November, second-ranked Penn State (10–0) opted to return to the Orange Bowl, and faced #6 Missouri (9–1). Penn State had several black players and wished to avoid Dallas due to segregation issues. At the time, the top-ranked team was defending champion Ohio State, who lost the next week at Michigan.

== Game summary ==
On a cool, clear day in Dallas, the two teams were even in first downs and were different in total yards by only 28. Both had over 70 offensive plays, the Irish had their passing attack and the Longhorns with their running attack. Notre Dame scored the first ten points; a Scott Hempel made a short field goal in the first quarter and Joe Theismann threw a 54-yard touchdown pass to Tom Gatewood early in the second. After the Irish kickoff, Texas went on a 74-yard drive that culminated with a one-yard Jim Bertelsen touchdown run that made the score 10–7 at halftime. After a scoreless third, the fourth quarter saw three touchdowns, each changing the lead. Longhorn Ted Koy culminated a 77-yard drive with his touchdown run with ten minutes remaining to give Texas a 14–10 advantage.

Theismann then led the Irish on an 80-yard drive and threw a 24-yard pass to Jim Yoder for a 17–14 lead with 6:52 left. The Longhorns then went on a 76-yard drive that included a fourth down pass from James Street to Cotton Speyrer that went eight yards down to the two. On third down from the one, Billy Dale's touchdown plunge came with 68 seconds remaining, too little time for the Irish as Texas secured its second consensus national championship in school history.

Despite the loss, Notre Dame climbed four spots in the final AP poll, ending at fifth.

Notre Dame Fighting Irish (8–1–1) vs. Texas Longhorns (10–0)

Quarter	1	2	3	4	Total
No. 9 Notre Dame	3	7	0	7	17
No. 1 Texas	0	7	0	14	21

at Cotton Bowl • Dallas, TX

- Date: Thursday, January 1, 1970
- Game time: 1:00 PM CDT
- Game weather: Clear, 48 °F (9 °C)
- Game attendance: 71,938
- Referee: Cliff Domingue
- TV announcers (CBS): Lindsey Nelson, Tom Brookshier
- Box Score

Game information

First Quarter

- (8:41) ND – Scott Hempel 26 yard field goal, ND 3–0; 16 plays, 82 yards, 6:14

Second Quarter

- (14:40) ND – Tom Gatewood 54 yard pass from Joe Theismann (Hempel kick), ND 10–0; 1 play, 54 yards, 0:08
- (11:12) UT – Jim Bertelsen 1 yard run (Feller kick), ND 10–7; 9 plays, 74 yards, 3:22

Fourth Quarter

- (10:05) UT – Ted Koy 3 yard run (Feller kick), UT 14–10; 18 plays, 77 yards, 6:10
- (6:52) ND – Jim Yoden 24 yard pass from Joe Theismann (Hempel kick), ND 17–14; 8 plays, 80 yards, 2:56
- (1:08) UT – Billy Dale 1 yard run (Feller kick), UT 21–17; 17 plays, 76 yards, 5:39

Statistics	ND	TEX
First downs	25	25
Total yards	420	438
Rushes/yards	43/189	67/331
Passing yards	231	107
Passing: Comp–Att–Int	17–27–2	6–11–1
Time of possession		

Team	Category	Player	Statistics
Notre Dame	Passing	Joe Theismann	17–27, 231 yards, 2 TDs, 2 INTs
Notre Dame	Rushing	Bill Barz	10 car, 49 yards
Notre Dame	Receiving	Tom Gatewood	6 rec, 112 yards, 1 TD
Texas	Passing	James Street	6–11, 107 yards, 1 INT
Texas	Rushing	Steve Worster	20 car, 155 yards
Texas	Receiving	Charles Speyrer	4 rec, 70 yards
