= Julius Whittier =

American football player (1950–2018)

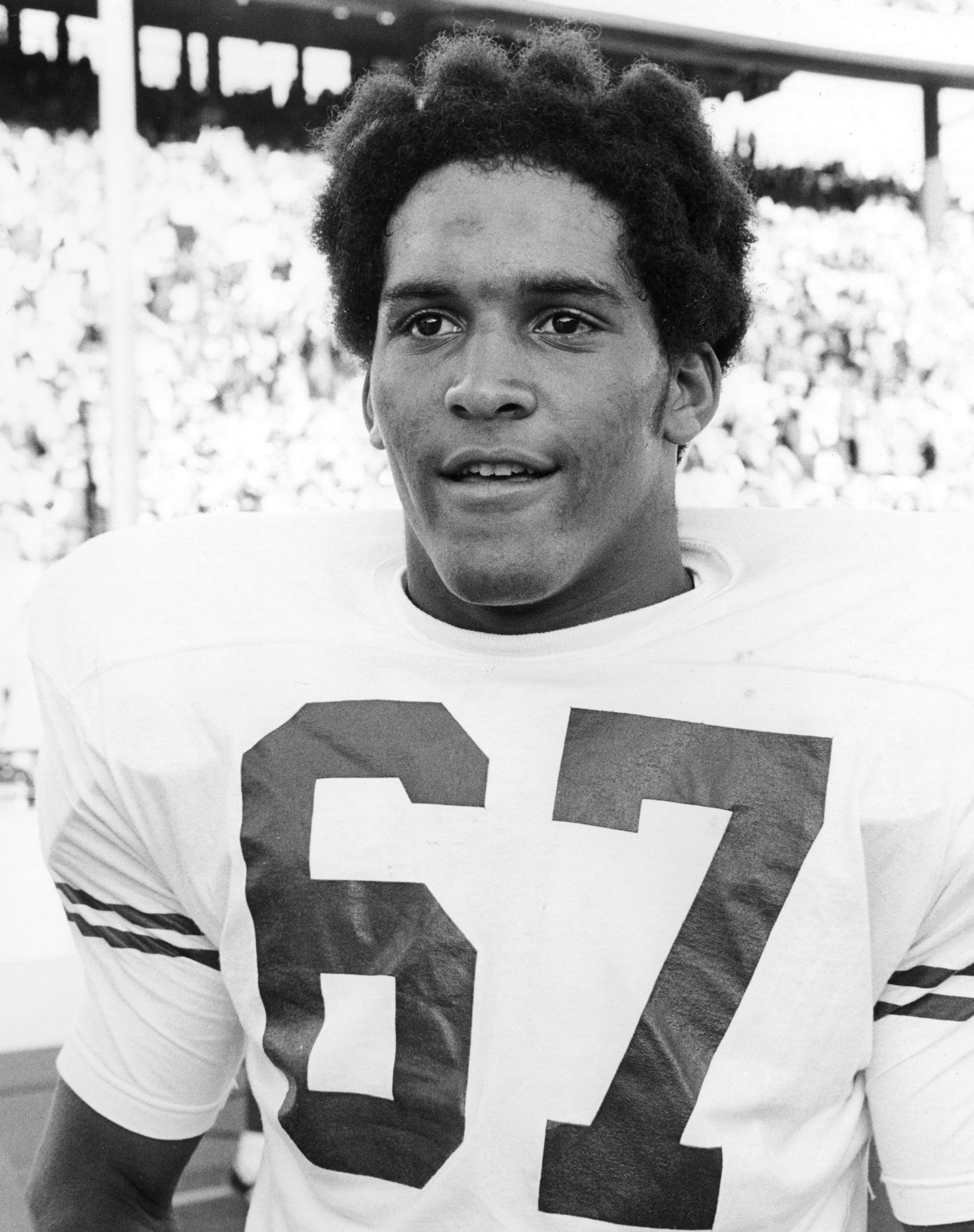
- Born: Julius Edward Whittier; July 7, 1950; San Antonio, Texas, U.S.
- Died: September 25, 2018 (aged 68)
- Education: University of Texas: B.A., 1972; JD, 1980; LBJ School of Public Affairs: M.A., (1976)
- Occupation: Prosecutor
- Known for: First black player on the University of Texas football team
- Football career

Profile
- Positions: Linebacker, offensive guard, offensive tackle, tight end

Career information
- High school: Highlands
- College: Texas

Awards and highlights
- National Championship (1970); Texas Athletics Hall of Honor (2013)

Julius Whittier (July 7, 1950 – September 25, 2018) was the first black player on the University of Texas football team, among his other accomplishments.

== Early life ==
Whittier was born Julius Edward Whittier in San Antonio, Texas, on July 7, 1950. His father, Oncy Whittier, was a doctor. His mother, Loraine, was a schoolteacher and community activist who had led protests against a grocery store chain that refused to employ black cashiers. He had a younger sister named Mildred. Whittier's uncle Edward Sprott was said by Whittier to have been the head of the N.A.A.C.P. in Beaumont, Texas, where his house was bombed.

Whittier was a star football player at Highlands High School in San Antonio. At the end of his high school career, he was recruited by the University of Texas.

Whittier's father and his high school coach conspired to hide the letters from college football programs who were trying to recruit him until after his high school had played its last game. Then his father presented him with two grocery bags of mail, and said, "I want you to read this one first." It was a letter from head coach Darrell Royal at the University of Texas. Whittier said later he didn't know what happened to the other letters. Later, assistant coach Mike Campbell visited him at home and offered him a scholarship.

At 5'10" and 193 pounds, Whittier was not as large as many college football players.

== College career and education ==
Whittier started attending the University of Texas in 1969. He did not make his debut on the field until 1970, because NCAA rules at the time did not allow freshmen to play varsity football. The 1969 Texas Longhorns football team was the last all-white national title team in college football history. Whittier says he played linebacker and offensive guard as a substitute during his sophomore year, and developed a routine with the quarterbacks where they would throw him the ball after a practice play. He also played offensive tackle. During workouts, he ran with the running backs instead of the linemen. Whittier said that by the time he was a senior, the coaches had noticed that he could catch the ball, and they moved him to tight end.

During Whittier's college career from 1970 to 1972, Texas won the 1970 national championship and the Southwest Conference title three years in a row. In total, the team went 20–1 in the Southwest conference, and 28-5 overall. In the 1972 season, Texas finished with a 10–1 record and a No. 3 national ranking, and capped off that year with a 17–13 upset victory over No. 4 Alabama in the Cotton Bowl. Whittier lettered in football all three years.

While playing football at Texas, Whittier earned a Bachelor of Arts in philosophy. He also studied dance, and danced with the Austin Civic Ballet.

During his college education, Whittier received advice from former President Johnson, who would invite Coach Darrell Royal and a few players to lunch at his ranch on occasion. Johnson suggested that Whittier continue his studies at the school of public affairs at UT, which was named after him.

After graduation, he worked briefly for the office of the Mayor of Boston. As President Johnson had suggested, Whittier then enrolled in the inaugural class of the LBJ School of Public Affairs, earning a master's degree in Public Policy in 1976. He then attended the University of Texas School of Law, where he earned a Juris Doctor in 1980 and was licensed as an attorney the same year.

== Professional career ==
For much of his professional career, he worked as a senior prosecutor in the Dallas County District Attorney's office. He retired in 2012 after being diagnosed with Alzheimer's disease.

While practicing law, Whittier continued to participate in UT alumni events such as those sponsored by the T-Association and the Texas Exes.

== Alzheimer's disease and death ==
Whittier's behavior began to change around 2008, according to his sister Mildred. At one point, one of Whittier's colleagues called her and told her that there were concerns about his mind wandering. He started repeatedly asking the same questions. In 2011, his kitchen caught fire, and his home was destroyed. He then agreed to undergo a neuropsychological examination which found that he was suffering from Alzheimer's. According to Mildred, he wandered away from home twice and lost the ability to process information and care for himself.

His family sued the NCAA in federal court in 2014 seeking up to $50 million for players from 1960 to 2014 who suffered brain injuries while playing college football.

Whittier died on September 25, 2018. The immediate cause of death was not revealed.

Whittier's surviving relatives included his sister Mildred, who cared for him during the last years of his life, another sister, Cheryl, and three daughters, Olivia, Cheyenne and Nahla.

A postmortem exam at Boston University revealed that he was suffering from chronic traumatic encephalopathy, a degenerative disease that is linked to head trauma. In June, 2020, Whittier's family filed another lawsuit in Dallas County against the NCAA for negligence and wrongful death. It is scheduled to come to trial in the spring of 2022.

== Legacy ==
Whittier's success opened doors between the University of Texas and black athletes.

Hall of Fame football legend Earl Campbell, who along with Ricky Williams gave his name to the field within the University of Texas football stadium, said, “I would not have been at this university except for Julius.” Campbell named Donnie Little, who was the first Black quarterback at Texas, Roosevelt Leaks, Raymond Clayborn and Ricky Williams as players for whom Whittier paved the way.

"Julius paved the road that gave us the opportunity," said Roosevelt Leaks, who was the first black football player from Texas to earn All-American and All-Conference honors. Whittier was Leaks' guide on campus when Leaks was being recruited.

== Honors ==
Whittier was inducted into the Texas Athletics Hall of Honor in 2013. His photograph is in the Frank Denius Family University of Texas Athletics Hall of Fame. He is a member of the San Antonio Independent School District Hall of Fame. After he died in 2018, the Texas Longhorns football team wore a "JW" decal on their helmets and dedicated a win over Kansas State to him.

On Friday, November 27, 2020, a 12-and-a-half foot bronze sculpture of Whittier was unveiled near the north end of Darrell K Royal-Texas Memorial Stadium. There was a discussion about naming part of the stadium for Whittier, but a statue was determined to be a better idea.
