= Happy Feller =

American football player (born 1949)

No. 1, 9
- Position: Kicker

Personal information
- Born: June 13, 1949 (age 77); Fredericksburg, Texas, U.S.
- Listed height: 5 ft 11 in (1.80 m)
- Listed weight: 185 lb (84 kg)

Career information
- College: Texas
- NFL draft: 1971: 4th round, 83rd overall pick

Career history
- Philadelphia Eagles (1971); New Orleans Saints (1972–1973)

Awards and highlights
- 2× National champion (1969, 1970); First-team All-American (1970)

Career NFL statistics
- Field goals made: 16
- Field goals attempted: 43
- Field goal %: 37.2
- Stats at Pro Football Reference

James Patrick "Happy" Feller (born June 13, 1949) is an American former professional football player who was a kicker in the National Football League (NFL). He played college football for the Texas Longhorns, earning All-American honors in 1970. He was selected by the Philadelphia Eagles in the fourth round of the 1971 NFL draft and played for one season for the team. He played for two seasons with the New Orleans Saints.

== Early life ==
Feller was nicknamed "Happy" because he smiled often as a child. He played high school football at Fredericksburg where he was an accomplished two-way player.

== College career ==
Feller played college football for the Texas Longhorns, where he was a walk on. He beat out Rob Layne, who started in 1967, for the starting kicker job before the start of the 1968 season. In 1968, Feller went 8-of-16 for field goals and 30-of-32 for extra point attempts. He made a 53-yarder against Oklahoma, a school record. He kicked a 55-yarder two years later against UCLA to break his own record.

In the season-opener in 1969 against the California Golden Bears, Feller kicked a 32-yard field goal in the third quarter and went two-for-two for extra point attempts. In week two against Texas Tech, he converted all seven extra points. He went seven-for-seven for extra point attempts on October 4 against Navy. In the Red River Shootout against Oklahoma on October 11, Feller kicked two field goals of 27 and 21 yards and converted all three extra point attempts as the Longhorns beat the Sooners 27–17. He had a 24-yard field goal and converted all four extra point attempts against Rice on October 25. Feller made a 32-yard field goal and converted all six extra point attempts against SMU on November 1. Against Baylor on November 8, he made all five extra point attempts. He went five-for-six on extra point attempts against TCU on November 15. Against the Texas A&M Aggies on November 27, Feller made a 43-yard field goal and converted four-of-seven extra point attempts. He converted on his only extra point attempt to give the Longhorns the win in the "Game of the Century" against Arkansas on December 6. In the Cotton Bowl Classic against Notre Dame on January 1, Feller went three-for-three for extra point attempts.

In 1970, he was named an All-American by The Sporting News and Pro Football Weekly, though these are not NCAA-recognized selectors.

In his time at Texas, he set new school and Southwest Conference records for PATs and touchbacks; and a then school record 55 extra points in 1970. He was also the first Longhorn to kick two FGs of 50 yards or more.

== NFL career ==
Feller was selected in the fourth round of the 1971 NFL draft by the Philadelphia Eagles. He was the first kicker selected in the draft. He played in 21 total games, but could never shake a quadriceps injury. He attempted 20 kicks in his rookie season, making just six. His longest field goal was from 50 yards out. It was his only season with the Eagles, as he spent the other two seasons with the Saints. In his second season, he went 6-for-11 in field goals, with his longest being from 46 yards. The 1973 season was his last professional season. He went 4-for-12 on field goals, with his longest being from 18 yards out.

== Later life ==
After leaving the NFL, Feller lived briefly in St. Louis and Dallas before returning to Austin, where he started a wholesale consumer electronics distribution company.

In 2014, he was admitted to the Longhorns Hall of Honor.
