= Ted Koy =

American football player (born 1947)

No. 38, 85, 37
- Positions: Tight end, running back, linebacker

Personal information
- Born: September 15, 1947 (age 79); Bellville, Texas, U.S.
- Listed height: 6 ft 2 in (1.88 m)
- Listed weight: 212 lb (96 kg)

Career information
- High school: Bellville (TX)
- College: Texas
- NFL draft: 1970: 2nd round, 50th overall pick

Career history
- Oakland Raiders (1970); Buffalo Bills (1971–1974)

Awards and highlights
- National champion (1969); Second-team All-SWC (1969)

Career NFL statistics
- Receptions: 11
- Receiving yards: 142
- Total TDs: 1
- Stats at Pro Football Reference

Ted Koy (born September 15, 1947) is an American football former tight end for the Buffalo Bills and Oakland Raiders of the National Football League (NFL). He was drafted 50th overall in the second round out of the University of Texas by the Raiders in the 1970 NFL draft. He was a part of the Longhorns' 1969 National Championship team, playing in the same offensive backfield (halfback) with James Street (quarterback), Steve Worster (fullback) and Jim Bertelsen (halfback). His brother Ernie Koy, Jr. also played with the Longhorns and in the NFL. His father Ernie Koy played Major League Baseball from 1938 through 1942 for five teams, and also played football at Texas.

He was drafted by the Fort Worth Braves in the 2nd round of the Texas Football League's 1970 draft, but he never played in that league.

He is a graduate of the veterinary school at Texas A&M. As of 1988, he was married to a woman named Lynn, divorced in 1996, and married Valerie in 1997.
