= Darrell Royal =

American football player and coach (1924–2012)

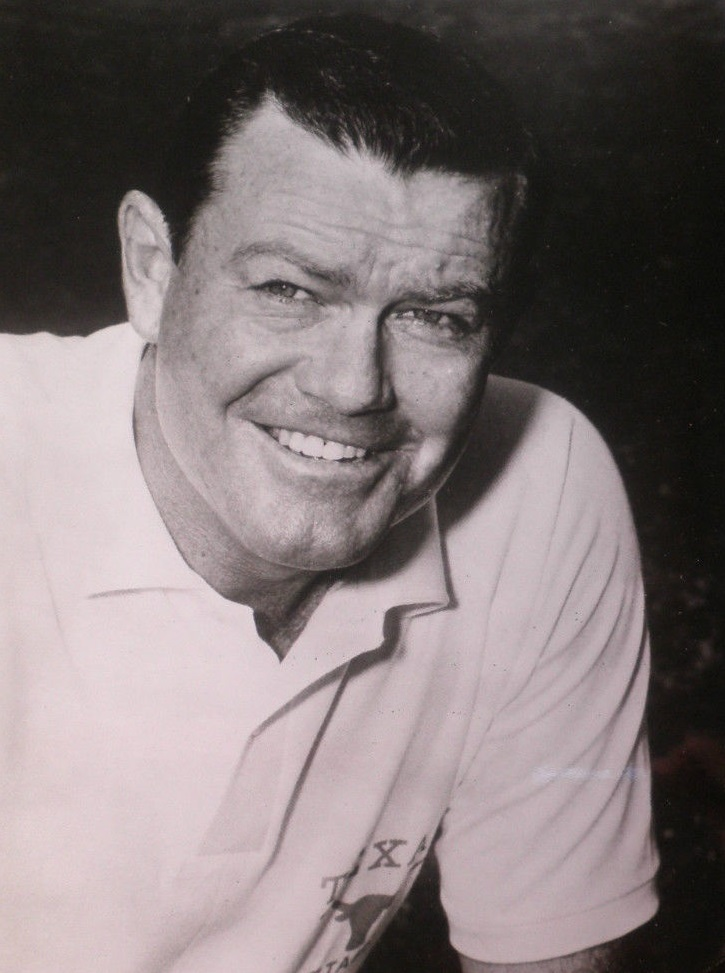
- Royal in 1966

Biographical details
- Born: July 6, 1924; Hollis, Oklahoma, U.S.
- Died: November 7, 2012 (aged 88); Austin, Texas, U.S.

Playing career
- 1946–1949: Oklahoma
- Positions: Quarterback, defensive back

Coaching career (HC unless noted)
- 1950: NC State (assistant)
- 1951: Tulsa (assistant)
- 1952: Mississippi State (off. backs)
- 1953: Edmonton Eskimos
- 1954–1955: Mississippi State
- 1956: Washington
- 1957–1976: Texas

Administrative career (AD unless noted)
- 1962–1980: Texas

Head coaching record
- Overall: 184–60–5 (college); 12–4 (CFL)
- Tournaments: 8–7–1 (bowl games); 1–2 (CFL playoffs)

Accomplishments and honors

Championships
- 3 National (1963, 1969, 1970); 11 SWC (1959, 1961–1963, 1968–1973, 1975)

Awards
- Amos Alonzo Stagg Award (2010); Paul "Bear" Bryant Lifetime Achievement Award (2000); 2× AFCA Coach of the Year (1963, 1970); 2× Sporting News College Football COY (1963, 1969); 2× Eddie Robinson Coach of the Year (1961, 1963); First-team All-American (1949); First-team All-Big Seven (1949); Second-team All-Big Seven (1948)
- College Football Hall of Fame; Inducted in 1983 (profile)

Darrell K Royal (July 6, 1924 – November 7, 2012) was an American college football player, coach, and athletics administrator. He served as the head football coach at Mississippi State University from 1954 to 1955, the University of Washington in 1956, and the University of Texas from 1957 to 1976, compiling a career record of 184 wins, 60 losses and five ties. During his 20-year tenure as the head coach of the Texas Longhorns, Royal's teams won three national championships and 11 Southwest Conference titles while finishing ranked in fifteen seasons. He amassed a record of 167–47–5 while in Austin and won more games than any other coach in Texas Longhorns football history. Royal never had a losing season as a head coach for his entire career.

Royal played college football as an All-American quarterback at the University of Oklahoma from 1946 to 1949 under coach Bud Wilkinson. Following graduation, he worked as an assistant coach at North Carolina State University and the University of Tulsa. Royal also coached the Edmonton Eskimos of the Western Interprovincial Football Union, the predecessor to the Canadian Football League (CFL), for one season in 1953.

From 1962 to 1980, Royal assumed the role of athletic director at Texas, succeeding Edwin Olle. Royal stepped down as head football coach after the 1976 season; two of his former assistant coaches, Fred Akers and David McWilliams, helmed the team for the next 15 years. In 1980, Royal moved to an advisory role under his successor DeLoss Dodds, before retiring in 1990. He was inducted into the Texas Sports Hall of Fame in 1976, and the College Football Hall of Fame as a coach in 1983. Darrell K Royal–Texas Memorial Stadium in Austin, Texas, where the Longhorns play their home games, was renamed in his honor in 1996.

== Early life ==
Royal was the youngest of six children born to Burley Ray and Katie Elizabeth (née Harmon) Royal in Hollis, Oklahoma. His middle initial "K" was given in honor of his mother, who died of cancer when he was an infant. Due to the stigma surrounding the disease at that time, Royal was led to believe until he was an adult that she had died giving birth to him. Burley Ray, a peace officer at the Harmon County jail, re-married five times after Katie's death.

During Royal's childhood, the town of Hollis was severely impacted by the Great Depression and bore the brunt of several devastating dust storms. Royal worked a paper route and picked cotton alongside his three older brothers, Glenn, Ray Jr. and Don, to help his family make ends meet. In 1940, Burley Ray migrated to California with Darrell and his brother Glenn, settling in the town of Porterville within the San Joaquin Valley. However, after failing to make the varsity football team at Porterville High School, Royal hitch-hiked back to Oklahoma, where he enrolled at Hollis High School. A multi-sport athlete, Royal played quarterback and punter on Hollis' varsity football team and earned first team All-State honors in 1942 during his senior season.

== Playing career ==
After graduating from Hollis High School, Royal served in the United States Army Air Corps from 1943 to 1946. He was initially trained as a rear gunner on a B-24 bomber, and later received training for photo reconnaissance missions before World War II came to a close. In the fall of 1945 Royal played football for the Third Air Force football team, and was spotted and recruited by scouts for the University of Oklahoma Sooners football program. He played quarterback and defensive back at the University of Oklahoma under his mentor, coach Bud Wilkinson, from 1946 to 1949. While attending Oklahoma, he joined the Delta Upsilon fraternity.

Royal was most noted for his prowess as a defensive back, where his 18 career interceptions and his three interceptions in the 1947 game against Oklahoma A&M (now Oklahoma State) are still Sooner records.

Royal's part-time contributions as quarterback had a similar impact, despite the fact that he shared time with Jack Mitchell and Claude Arnold at the position. He threw a 43-yard pass against North Carolina in the 1949 Sugar Bowl. Royal holds the fourth-best winning percentage in school history (minimum 15 starts) with a 16–1 mark as a part-time quarterback starter. His 11–0 mark as a starter in 1949 ranks as one of the best seasons in school history.

In 1992, Royal was inducted into the Oklahoma Sports Hall of Fame.

== Coaching career ==
=== Early positions ===
Royal served as an assistant coach at North Carolina State, Tulsa and Mississippi State.

His first head coaching job, and the only one at the professional level, was with the Edmonton Eskimos of the Canadian Football League. There he coached two Longhorns - Charley Genthner and Tommy Stolhandske - and led the team into the playoffs. He left to coach at Mississippi State.

In 1954, he returned to Mississippi State for his first collegiate head coaching job.

After two seasons, he left for Washington in the Pacific Coast Conference, but stayed in Seattle for less than ten months.

=== University of Texas ===
Royal took over as head coach at the University of Texas (UT) on December 18, 1956. The team went from a 1–9 record in 1956, their worst record ever, to a 6–4–1 mark in 1957 and a berth in the Sugar Bowl. Within two years, Royal had the Longhorns in the Cotton Bowl as the number-four team in the country. In Royal's 20 years as head coach, Texas never had a losing season. Royal posted a 167–47–5 (.774) record at Texas, and his overall record was 184–60–5 (.749). Some of his most memorable games were against the Arkansas Razorbacks, and fellow College Football Hall of Fame head coach Frank Broyles.

With Royal at the helm, Texas won the school's first three national championships (1963, 1969 and 1970), won or shared 11 Southwest Conference championships, and made 16 bowl appearances. His 1963 and 1969 teams finished the season undefeated and untied—something no Longhorn team would do again until 2005.

Royal's teams were known for being very run-oriented. The quote, "Three things can happen when you pass, and two of them are bad," is often attributed to Royal, but Royal himself attributed it to another run-first coach, Woody Hayes.

Royal's coaching tactics were the subject of criticism in Gary Shaw's exposé of college football recruiting and coaching practices, Meat on the Hoof, which was published in 1972, six years after Shaw left the Texas football program.

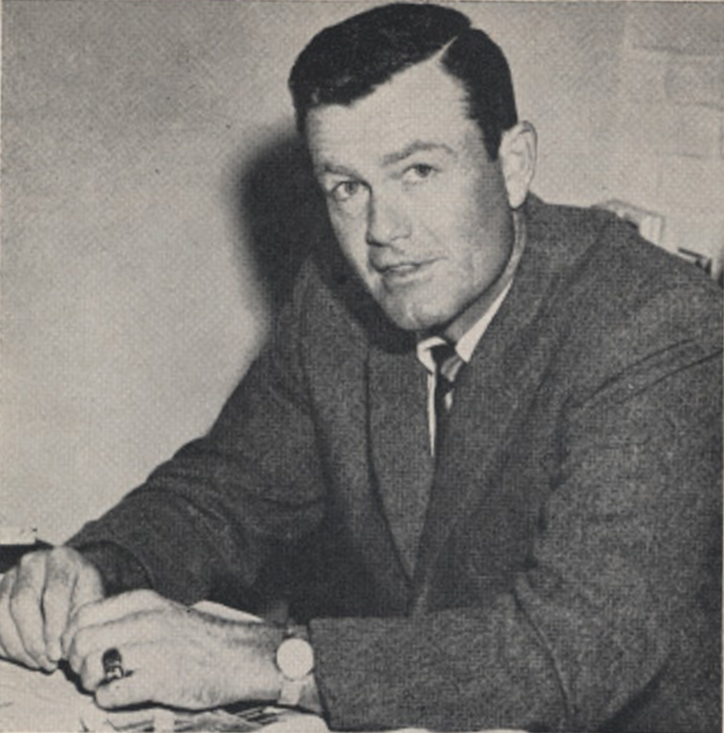
Royal, c. 1964

Beginning in 1962, Royal also served as Texas' athletic director. He retired from coaching in 1976 and remained director of athletics until 1980. He then served as special assistant to the university president on athletic programs.

During his tenure, Royal oversaw the integration of African-Americans into the UT athletics program. At that time, while UT began admitting black students in 1956 and opening the athletics program to them in 1963, there were no black student-athletes well into the late 1960s.

In a confidential University of Texas memo dated November 10, 1959 which related to how various coaches at the university felt about black players, it was stated that "Coach Royal has coached Negro students, but says they create problems. White players particularly resented Negro boys coming in their room and lounging on their beds. Darrell was quite pronounced in not wanting any Negroes on his team until other Southwest Conference teams admit them and until the housing problem is solved or conditions change."

In 2005, Royal retrospectively noted that "things they are a-changing. But they weren't changing that quickly around here at the time." He offered a scholarship to Julius Whittier (1950-2018) of San Antonio after the last recipient dropped out due to poor academic performance, and Whittier became the first black student-athlete to play for the Texas Longhorns football team. Whittier went on to graduate from the Lyndon B. Johnson School of Public Affairs in 1976 with a master's degree and worked as a chief prosecutor with the Dallas District Attorney's Office.

Royal also coached Freddie Steinmark, who was a member of the 1969 Longhorns National Championship team and subsequently died from bone cancer. Steinmark has been the topic of several books and a 2015 movie, My All American where Royal was portrayed by Aaron Eckhart.

In 1996, the University honored Royal by renaming Texas Memorial Stadium as Darrell K Royal–Texas Memorial Stadium. Royal was elected to the College Football Hall of Fame in 1983.

Coach Royal was famous for the inspirational Royalisms he deployed as motivational tools. These sayings include:

- "God gives talent, size, speed. But a guy can control how hard he tries."
- "I want to be remembered as a winning coach, but I also want to be remembered as an honest and ethical coach."
- "You've got to think lucky. If you fall into a mud hole, check your back pocket—you might have caught a fish."
- "Punt returns will kill you quicker than a minnow can swim a dipper."
- "Don't matter what they throw at us. Only angry people win football games."

== Late life and death ==
Royal spent his retired years enjoying life with his wife, Edith, and close friends such as former president Lyndon B. Johnson and noted musician Willie Nelson. He enjoyed playing golf and spending time in nature. In 1991, Royal paid $117,350 for Willie Nelson's Pedernales Country Club after it was seized by the IRS due to Nelson's tax debt. Royal and professional baseball player Pete Runnels also helped found a co-ed summer camp, Camp Champions in Marble Falls, Texas, which is still in existence.

Royal died on November 7, 2012, due to complications of Alzheimer's disease. He is interred at the Texas State Cemetery in Austin, Texas.

Royal was survived by his wife Edith (1925–2024), whom he married on July 26, 1944. They have a son, Sammy Mack, and two predeceased children, Marian Royal Kazen (1945–73) and David Wade Royal (1952–82), both of whom died in automobile-related accidents.

== Head coaching record ==
=== College ===
Year	Team	Overall	Conference	Standing	Bowl/playoffs	Coaches^{#}	AP^{°}
Mississippi State Bulldogs (Southeastern Conference) (1954–1955)
1954	Mississippi State	6–4	3–3	T–6th			
1955	Mississippi State	6–4	4–4	6th			
Mississippi State:		12–8	7–7				
Washington Huskies (Pacific Coast Conference) (1956)
1956	Washington	5–5	4–4	T–4th			
Washington:		5–5	4–4				
Texas Longhorns (Southwest Conference) (1957–1976)
1957	Texas	6–4–1	4–1–1	2nd	L Sugar	11	11
1958	Texas	7–3	3–3	4th			
1959	Texas	9–2	5–1	T–1st	L Cotton	4	4
1960	Texas	7–3–1	5–2	T–2nd	T Bluebonnet	17	
1961	Texas	10–1	6–1	T–1st	W Cotton	4	3
1962	Texas	9–1–1	6–0–1	1st	L Cotton	4	4
1963	Texas	11–0	7–0	1st	W Cotton	1	1
1964	Texas	10–1	6–1	2nd	W Orange	5	5
1965	Texas	6–4	3–4	T–4th			
1966	Texas	7–4	5–2	2nd	W Bluebonnet		
1967	Texas	6–4	4–3	T–3rd			
1968	Texas	9–1–1	6–1	T–1st	W Cotton	5	3
1969	Texas	11–0	7–0	1st	W Cotton	1	1
1970	Texas	10–1	7–0	1st	L Cotton	1	3
1971	Texas	8–3	6–1	1st	L Cotton	12	18
1972	Texas	10–1	7–0	1st	W Cotton	5	3
1973	Texas	8–3	7–0	1st	L Cotton	8	14
1974	Texas	8–4	5–2	T–2nd	L Gator		17
1975	Texas	10–2	6–1	T–1st	W Astro-Bluebonnet	7	6
1976	Texas	5–5–1	4–4	5th			
Texas:		167–47–5	109–27–2				
Total:		184–60–5					
National championship Conference title Conference division title or championship game berth
^{#}Rankings from final Coaches Poll.; ^{°}Rankings from final AP Poll.

=== Canadian football ===
Team	Year	Regular season					Postseason			
Team	Year	Won	Lost	Ties	Win %	Finish	Won	Lost	Win %	Result
EDM	1953	12	4	0	.750	1st in WIFU	1	2	.333	Lost in WIFU Final 1–2
Total		12	4	0	.750		1	2	.333	

== See also ==
- List of presidents of the American Football Coaches Association
