= Steve Worster =

American football player (1949–2022)

Profile
- Position: Fullback

Personal information
- Born: July 8, 1949; Rawlins, Wyoming, U.S.
- Died: August 13, 2022 (aged 73)
- Listed height: 6 ft 0 in (1.83 m)
- Listed weight: 210 lb (95 kg)

Career information
- High school: Bridge City (Bridge City, Texas)
- College: Texas
- NFL draft: 1971: 4 / Pick 90th round

Career history
- 1971: Hamilton Tiger-Cats

Awards and highlights
- 2× National champion (1969, 1970); Consensus All-American (1970); First-team All-American (1969); 3× First-team All-SWC (1968, 1969, 1970)

Steven Clark Worster (July 8, 1949 – August 13, 2022) was an American professional football player who was a fullback for the Hamilton Tiger-Cats in the Canadian Football League (CFL). Following his prep career in Texas, he played college football for the Texas Longhorns under coach Darrell Royal. A two-time All-American, Worster was the inspiration for the team's wishbone formation, and won two national championships with the Longhorns.

== Early life ==
Worster was born in Rawlins, Wyoming, on July 8, 1949, but his parents settled in Orange County, Texas when he was a young boy. Worster attended Bridge City High School in Bridge City, Texas, where he played as a catcher on the baseball team and a fullback on the football team. He was All-District for four years, All-State for three years, and accumulated 5,422 yards during his high school career, including 38 100-yard games, which is second in Texas prep history behind Robert Strait's 41 (Ken Hall and Billy Sims also had 38 100-yard games). Worster led the Bridge City Cardinals to a 13–1 season and the Class 3-A state football championship in 1966, running for 2,210 yards and being named a High-School All-American.

After his graduation, Bridge City High School retired his jersey number. He was later inducted into the Texas High School Hall of Fame.

== College career ==
Worster was heavily recruited to play college football for several schools. He chose to accept a scholarship to the University of Texas at Austin to play for the Longhorns, where he played under coach Darrell Royal. He was the motivation behind Royal's famed wishbone offense, which was introduced in 1968. Fans nicknamed Worster "Big Woo".

During his years at Texas, Worster rushed for 2,353 yards and scored 36 touchdowns. His teams won three Southwest Conference titles and two national championships. Worster was featured on the cover of Dave Campbell's Texas Football magazine in 1970. He finished fourth in balloting for the Heisman Trophy, behind Jim Plunkett, Joe Theismann, and Archie Manning. Worster was a two-time All-American (1969 and 1970) and three-time All-Southwest Conference selection, and was voted 1970 Texas Amateur Athlete of the Year by Texas Sports Writers Association. Worster has also been inducted into the Texas Longhorn Hall of Fame and the Cotton Bowl Hall of Fame.

In 1979, he was named to the Southwest Conference All-1970's team.

== Professional career ==
The Los Angeles Rams of the National Football League (NFL) selected Worster as the 90th overall pick in the fourth round of the 1971 NFL draft. He could not come to terms on a contract with the Rams, and became so disgusted with the process that he decided to play in the CFL instead

=== Hamilton Tiger-Cats ===
Worster signed a 3 year $100,000 contract with the Hamilton Tiger-Cats on May 28, 1971. He played in 3 games, gaining 72 yards on 23 carries and 1 touchdown as well as 83 yards on 5 receptions, most of that on a 55 yard touchdown reception, before being cut in August after being charged with marijuana possession.

That September he re-enrolled at Texas to finish his degree. In November he pled guilty to possession and paid a $100 fine. Years later he claimed the Ti-cats set him up to get rid of him.

=== St. Louis Cardinals ===
In early 1972, the Cardinals traded a fourth round pick to the Rams for Worster who then signed with the team. In July he left the Cardinals training camp.

Worster decided that football was no longer fun, leading him to retire.

== Later life ==
Worster completed his bachelor's degree and then worked in sales for 28 years after retiring from football, and then managed rental properties. He moved to San Antonio, then Austin, and then back to Bridge City after retiring from football. Worster was a sales manager for the Lone Star Brewing Company in San Antonio. He met his wife, Ann, in San Antonio. They had two children prior to their divorce.

Worster died on August 13, 2022.
