= List of people from Wheat Ridge, Colorado =

Coordinates: 39.7661°N 105.0772°W

Location of Wheat Ridge in Colorado

This is a list of some notable people who have lived in the City of Wheat Ridge, Colorado, United States.

== Arts and entertainment ==
- Robert Adams (1937– ), photographer
- Dean Reed (1938–1986), actor, director, singer, and songwriter
- Nick Stabile (1971– ), actor

== Business ==
- Tim Gill (1953– ), co-founder of Quark, Inc. and LGBT rights activist
- Bill Harmsen (1912–2002), candy maker, art collector, and co-founder of the Jolly Rancher Candy Company
- Dorothy Harmsen (1914–2006), candy maker, art collector, and co-founder of the Jolly Rancher Candy Company

== Crime ==
- Cassie Bernall (1981–1999), victim of the Columbine High School massacre

== Politics ==
=== National ===
- Troy Eid (1963– ), U.S. attorney for Colorado
- Roy H. McVicker (1924–1973), U.S. representative from Colorado
- Daniel Schaefer (1936–2006), U.S. representative from Colorado

=== State ===
- Jessie Danielson (1978– ), Colorado state legislator
- Cheri Jahn (1953– ), Colorado state legislator
- Homer Pearson (1900–1985), Lieutenant Governor of Colorado, speaker of the Colorado House of Representatives
- Sue Schafer, Colorado state legislator

== Religion ==
- Michelle Duppong (1984–2015), lay Catholic FOCUS missionary currently on the path for canonization

== Sports ==
=== American football ===
- Ray Johnson (1914–1990), defensive back, tailback
- Terry Kunz (1952– ), running back
- Dave Logan (1954– ), wide receiver, coach, radio and television host

=== Baseball ===
- Mark Johnson (1975– ), MLB catcher
- Mark Melancon (1985– ), relief pitcher for the San Francisco Giants

=== Bodybuilding ===
- Heather Armbrust (1977– ), IFBB professional bodybuilder
- Phil Heath (1979– ), IFBB professional bodybuilder and current Mr. Olympia

=== Cycling ===
- Linda Brenneman (1965– ), Olympic cyclist
- Ron Kiefel (1960– ), professional cyclist and Olympic medalist

=== Golf ===
- Paige Spiranac (1993– ), professional golfer

=== Soccer ===
- Sam Bassett (2003– ), midfielder
- Aleisha Cramer (1982– ), midfielder
- Paolo DelPiccolo (1991– ), midfielder
- Todd Dunivant (1980– ), defender
- Bill Sedgewick (1971– ), defender, midfielder

=== Other ===
- Pat Frink (1945–2012), NBA player (Cincinnati Royals)

== See also ==
- List of people from Colorado
- Bibliography of Colorado
- Geography of Colorado
- History of Colorado
- Index of Colorado-related articles
- List of Colorado-related lists
- Outline of Colorado
