= Freddie Joe Steinmark =

American football player (1949–1971)

Personal information
- Born: January 27, 1949; Denver, Colorado, U.S.
- Died: June 6, 1971 (aged 22); Houston, Texas, U.S.
- Listed height: 5 ft 9 in (1.75 m)
- Listed weight: 164 lb (74 kg)

Career information
- High school: Wheat Ridge (Wheat Ridge, Colorado)
- College: Texas (1968–1969)

Awards and highlights
- National champion (1969); Second-team All-SWC (1969)

Freddie Joe Steinmark (January 27, 1949 – June 6, 1971) was an American college football player for the University of Texas Longhorns. He inspired his teammates by his faith after his diagnosis of bone cancer and subsequent leg amputation during his junior year. Twenty days later, he observed from the sidelines, and his team won the national championship that year. Steinmark has posthumously been the subject of a number of inspirational books and a movie.

== Football career ==
After winning the Denver Post's Gold Helmet award and helping Wheat Ridge High School win its first state football championship, Steinmark was a member of the 1969 Texas Longhorns football team, which won a national championship.

Texas beat the 1969 Arkansas Razorbacks football team 15-14 in the "Game of the Century" on December 6, 1969. Two days later, x-rays revealed a bone tumor just above his left knee. A biopsy confirmed the tumor was malignant osteogenic sarcoma, and he was treated at the M.D. Anderson Cancer Center in Houston. On December 12, 1969, his leg was amputated at the hip.

Twenty days later, Steinmark stood on the sideline with his team as Texas defeated Notre Dame in the 1970 Cotton Bowl Classic on New Year's Day. Steinmark's fight against cancer inspired the United States Congress to write the National Cancer Act of 1971 and President Richard Nixon to sign it into law, thus beginning the "war on cancer". Texas beat the legendary Joe Theismann in the 1970 Cotton Bowl.

== Autobiography ==
In 1971, with the help of Dallas Times Herald sports editor Blackie Sherrod, Steinmark wrote and published his autobiography I Play to Win. The book was published posthumously, about 3 months after Steinmark's death. He died on June 6, 1971, at the University of Texas MD Anderson Cancer Center. He was a Roman Catholic.

Steinmark is the subject of the 2015 movie My All American, and a related biography Freddie Steinmark: Faith, Family, Football, published by the University of Texas Press (September 1, 2015).

== Legacy ==
Steinmark was posthumously honored with the Darrell K Royal–Texas Memorial Stadium's scoreboard on September 23, 1972. The current version of the Freddie Steinmark scoreboard, nicknamed Godzillatron, stands forty-seven-feet high.

On November 7, 2015, the University of Texas Longhorns rededicated the scoreboard to Steinmark in a ceremony attended by the Steinmark family and many previous Longhorn players. The Longhorns wore throwback uniforms similar to those worn by the 1969 squad for their game against the Kansas Jayhawks. The "Texas" wordmark was absent from the front of the jerseys, as were TV numerals from the shoulder pads, and names from the back. The helmets featured the decal for college football's centennial, which was celebrated in 1969.

An annual award named in Steinmark's honor is given to one male and one female high school athlete in Colorado. The first winner, and thus far only winner from Steinmark's Wheat Ridge High School, was Dave Logan.

== Other ==
In 1967, Steinmark was drafted out of high school by the Cincinnati Reds in the 69th round of the 1967 MLB draft as the 962nd overall pick as a shortstop.

== See also ==
- List of American football players who died during their career
- Freddie Steinmark: Faith, Family, Football
- My All American
