= Colorado's 2nd House of Representatives district =

American legislative district

Colorado's 2nd State House of Representatives district
Representative
Steven Woodrow; D–Denver
- Registration: 41.6% Democratic; 13.3% Republican; 43.8% No party preference
- Demographics: 77% White; 3% Black; 12% Hispanic; 3% Asian; 5% Multiracial
- Population (2021): 86,358
- Registered voters: 63,121

Colorado's 2nd House of Representatives district is one of 65 districts in the Colorado House of Representatives. It has been represented by Democrat Steven Woodrow since 2023.

== Geography ==
District 2 covers southern Denver.

The district is located entirely within Colorado's 1st congressional district and overlaps with the 31st, 32nd and 34th districts of the Colorado Senate.

== List of members representing the district ==
Member	Party	Years	Counties Represented
Single member districts implemented 1969
Ben Klein (Denver)	Democratic	1969 – 1970	Denver
Ruben A. Valdez (Denver)	Democratic	1971 – 1972	Denver
Richard Lamm (Denver)	Democratic	1973 – 1974	Arapahoe, Denver
Wayne N. Knox (Denver)	Democratic	1975 – 1982	Arapahoe, Denver
George M. Chavez (Denver)	Democratic	1983 – 1984	Denver
Anthony Jesse Hernandez (Denver)	Democratic	1985 – 1993	Denver
Douglas D. Linkhart (Denver)	Democratic	1994 – 1995	Denver
Gloria Leyba (Denver)	Democratic	1996 – 2000	Denver
Desiree Sanchez (Denver)	Democratic	2001 – 2003	Denver
Mike Cerbo (Denver)	Democratic	2003 – 2007	Denver
Mark Ferrandino (Denver)	Democratic	2007 – 2014	Denver
Alec Garnett (Denver)	Democratic	2015 – 2022	Denver
Steven Woodrow (Denver)	Democratic	2023 – Present	Denver

== Recent election results ==
=== 2022 ===
2022 Colorado House of Representatives election, District 2
Primary election
Party	Candidate	Votes	%
Democratic	Steven Woodrow	14,067	100
Total votes		14,067	100
General election
Democratic	Steven Woodrow	34,213	75.40
Republican	Stephanie Wheeler	10,476	23.09
Libertarian	Justin Savoy	689	1.52
Total votes		45,378	100
Democratic hold			

=== 2020 ===
2020 Colorado House of Representatives election, District 2
Primary election
Party	Candidate	Votes	%
Democratic	Alec Garnett	25,709	100
Total votes		25,709	100
General election
Democratic	Alec Garnett	45,369	80.58
Republican	Victoria Partridge	10,935	19.42
Total votes		56,304	100
Democratic hold			

=== 2018 ===
2018 Colorado House of Representatives election, District 2
Primary election
Party	Candidate	Votes	%
Democratic	Alec Garnett	16,041	100
Total votes		16,041	100
General election
Democratic	Alec Garnett	40,121	100
Total votes		40,121	100
Democratic hold			

=== 2016 ===
2016 Colorado House of Representatives election, District 2
Primary election
Party	Candidate	Votes	%
Democratic	Alec Garnett	6,301	100
Total votes		6,301	100
General election
Democratic	Alec Garnett	34,422	73.28
Republican	Paul A. Linton	12,550	26.72
Total votes		46,972	100
Democratic hold			

=== 2014 ===
2014 Colorado House of Representatives election, District 2
Primary election
Party	Candidate	Votes	%
Democratic	Alec Garnett	3,478	56.44
Democratic	Owen Perkins	2,684	43.56
Total votes		6,162	100
General election
Democratic	Alec Garnett	24,261	72.54
Republican	Jon Roberts	9,162	27.39
Write-in		22	0.07
Total votes		33,445	100
Democratic hold			

=== 2012 ===
2012 Colorado House of Representatives election, District 2
Primary election
Party	Candidate	Votes	%
Democratic	Mark Ferrandino	3,548	100
Total votes		3,548	100
General election
Democratic	Mark Ferrandino	30,417	70.31
Republican	TJ Tyrrell	10,444	24.14
Libertarian	Desiree A. Maikranz	2,398	5.54
Total votes		43,259	100
Democratic hold			

=== 2010 ===
2010 Colorado House of Representatives election, District 2
Primary election
Party	Candidate	Votes	%
Democratic	Mark Ferrandino	3,102	100
Total votes		3,102	100
General election
Democratic	Mark Ferrandino	9,360	77.79
Republican	Doe Miller	2,673	22.21
Total votes		12,033	100
Democratic hold			
