= Jennifer Veiga =

American attorney and politician from Colorado

Jennifer L. Veiga

Member of the Colorado Senate from the 31st district
- In office July 28, 2003 – May 15, 2009
- Preceded by: Doug Linkhart
- Succeeded by: Pat Steadman

Member of the Colorado House of Representatives from the 3rd district
- In office January 1997 – July 21, 2003
- Succeeded by: Anne McGihon

Personal details
- Born: October 10, 1962 (age 63) Long Beach, California, U.S.
- Party: Democratic
- Domestic partner: Bronwyn Russell
- Occupation: Attorney, politician
- Website: web.archive.org/web/20121009014647/http://www.minterellison.com/People/jennifer_veiga/

Jennifer L. Veiga (born October 10, 1962) is a former American attorney and politician from Colorado. Veiga is a former Democratic member of Colorado House of Representatives and member of Colorado's 31st Senate district, covering downtown and north-central Denver.

She announced on April 7, 2009 that she would be resigning her seat to move to Australia where her partner's mother was ill. Her resignation became effective on May 15 and, on May 29, Pat Steadman was sworn-in as her successor.

== Biography ==
Graduating from Irvine High School in 1980, she went on to the University of Colorado at Boulder where she earned a Bachelor of Arts degree in political science in 1983. She then received a Juris Doctor from the George Washington University Law School in Washington, D.C. in 1987.

A practicing lawyer with the Denver law firm Hall & Evans, LLC specializing in civil ligitagation, Veiga was elected to the Colorado House of Representatives in 1996 and re-elected three times, in 1998, 2000, and 2002. In 2003, she served as House Minority Leader, as well as a member of the Executive Committee and the Legislative Council.

In July 2003, she was named by a Vacancy Committee to the 31st District seat in the Colorado Senate following the resignation of Doug Linkhart. She ran unopposed for election to the Senate seat in November 2004 and won re-election in 2008. She served as Chairman of the Senate Business, Labor and Technology Committee, Vice-Chairman of the Senate Finance Committee, and as a member of the Senate Appropriations Committee.

A lesbian, she came out publicly in August 2002 and is the first ever openly gay person to serve in the Colorado legislature. As a representative and then as a senator, Veiga introduced legislation every year to ban employment discrimination based on sexual orientation, at first with little success. In 2005 and then in 2006, Veiga's non-discrimination bill was passed by the legislature, but vetoed by Gov. Bill Owens; in 2007, however, the bill was signed into law by Gov. Bill Ritter. At the time of her retirement, she was one of three openly gay members of the legislature, serving alongside representatives Mark Ferrandino (D-Denver) and Sue Schafer (D-Wheat Ridge).
