= List of people from Golden, Colorado =

Coordinates: 39.7555°N 105.2211°W

Location of Golden in Colorado

This is a list of some notable people who have lived in the City of Golden, Colorado, United States.

== Academia ==
- John C. Bailar, Jr. (1904–1991), chemist
- Anthony R. Barringer (1925–2009), geophysicist
- Edward L. Berthoud (1828–1908), engineer, historian, mayor of Golden, Colorado state legislator
- Vine Deloria, Jr. (1933–2005), American Indian activist, theologian
- Dennis Robert Hoagland (1884–1949), botanist
- Arthur Lakes (1844–1917), geologist
- Robert W. Richardson (1910–2007), railroad historian

== Arts and entertainment ==
=== Film, television, and theatre ===
- Greg Germann (1958– ), actor
- Johnny Hines (1895–1970), actor
- Shayla LaVeaux, adult film actress
- Chick Morrison (1878–1924), early western movie actor, brother of Pete Morrison
- Pete Morrison (1890–1973), early western movie actor

=== Journalism ===
- Edgar Watson Howe (1853–1937), newspaper editor, novelist

=== Literature ===
- Francine Mathews (1963– ), novelist

=== Music ===
- Matt Pike (1972– ), guitarist, singer

=== Other visual arts ===
- Gertrude Käsebier (1852–1934), photographer
- David Uhl (1961– ), painter

== Business ==
- Adolph Coors (1847–1929), brewer
- Adolph Coors II (1884–1970), brewing executive
- Joseph Coors (1917–2003), brewing executive
- Pete Coors (1946– ), brewing executive
- Bill Harmsen (1912–2002), candy maker
- Dorothy Harmsen (1914–2006), candy maker
- William A. H. Loveland (1826–1894), railroad entrepreneur
- Bill Phillips (1964– ), fitness entrepreneur, bodybuilder
- George Pullman (1831–1897), engineer, rail car manufacturer
- Samuel M. Reed (1901–1996), drive-in speaker entrepreneur

== Military ==
- Wendell Fertig (1900–1975), U.S. Army colonel, led resistance fighters in Philippines during World War II, author of They Fought Alone
- Dale Gardner (1948–2014), U.S. Navy captain, astronaut

== Politics ==
=== National ===
- Silas W. Burt (1830–1912), Naval officer of Port of New York and Civil Service commissioner of New York
- Holly Coors (1920–2009), conservative political activist
- Frederick Dent Grant (1850–1912), military governor of Pampanga and U.S. minister to Austria-Hungary
- George E. Spencer (1836–1893), U.S. senator from Alabama

=== State ===
- Brian Boatright (1962– ), Colorado Supreme Court chief justice
- Alexander Cummings (1810–1879), 3rd governor of Colorado Territory
- William L. Douglas (1845–1924), 42nd governor of Massachusetts
- John Frullo (1962– ), Texas state legislator
- Frank B. Morrison (1905–2004), 31st governor of Nebraska
- George Alexander Parks (1883–1984), 5th governor of Alaska Territory
- William Grover Smith (1857–1921), 6th lieutenant governor of Colorado
- Robert Williamson Steele (1820–1901), representative of Nebraska Territory, provisional governor of Jefferson Territory (extralegal)
- John Charles Vivian (1887–1964), 30th governor of Colorado

== Religion ==
- Frances Xavier Cabrini (1850–1917), Catholic missionary and saint
- George Randall (1810–1873), Episcopal bishop

== Sports ==
=== Baseball ===
- Ralph Glaze (1881–1968), multi-sport athlete, coach and athletic director
- Roy Hartzell (1881–1961), infielder, outfielder
- Cowboy Jones (1874–1958), pitcher
- Keli McGregor (1963–2010), president of Colorado Rockies, football tight end
- Mark Melancon (1985– ), pitcher
- Walter Pennington (1998– ), pitcher
- Steve Reed (1965– ), pitcher

=== Basketball ===
- Jimmy Darden (1922–1994), player-coach and point guard Denver Nuggets (1948-50)

=== Football ===
- Lloyd Madden (1918–2011), running back for Chicago Cardinals

=== Soccer ===
- Tesho Akindele (1992– ), soccer forward FC Dallas, Orlando City SC
- Mike Flater (1951– ), soccer forward North American Soccer League (1968-1984), football kicker
- Lindsey Heaps (née Horan) (1994– ), soccer forward, midfielder, captain U.S. women's soccer team, U.S. Olympic gold and bronze medalist

=== Track and field ===
- Brianne Nelson (1980– ), distance runner
- Tyler Pennel (1987– ), distance runner

=== Other ===
- Gudy Gaskill (1927–2016), mountaineer, developer of the Colorado Trail
- Alex Howes (1988– ), cyclist
- Elwood Romney (1911–1970), basketball forward, coach
- Jarret Thomas (1981– ), U.S. Olympic snowboarder and bronze medalist

== See also ==
- List of people from Colorado
- Bibliography of Colorado
- Geography of Colorado
- History of Colorado
- Index of Colorado-related articles
- List of Colorado-related lists
- Outline of Colorado
