= Pat Steadman =

American politician

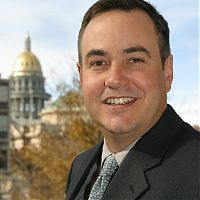

Member of the Colorado Senate from the 31st district
- In office May 29, 2009 – January 11, 2017
- Preceded by: Jennifer Veiga
- Succeeded by: Lois Court

Personal details
- Born: March 31, 1964 (age 62)
- Party: Democratic
- Domestic partner: Dave Misner (2000-2012, his death.)
- Profession: Attorney; lobbyist
- Website: patsteadman.com

Patrick "Pat" Steadman (born March 31, 1964) is an attorney, former legislator, and former lobbyist from the U.S. state of Colorado. Steadman, a Democrat, was appointed to the Colorado Senate in May 2009 following the resignation of Jennifer Veiga. He represented the 31st Senate district, which covered downtown and north-central Denver and portions of Adams County. He did not seek re-election in 2016, and his term ended in January, 2017.

== Biography ==
A resident of Denver's Capitol Hill neighborhood, Steadman grew up in Westminster, Colorado, graduating from Westminster High School, Regis College and the University of Colorado Law School. In 2013, Steadman completed Harvard University's John F. Kennedy School of Government program for Senior Executives in State and Local Government as a David Bohnett LGBTQ Victory Institute Leadership Fellow. He became an attorney and prominent lobbyist at the Capitol, best known for his advocacy on gay rights issues. Steadman met David Misner in 2000 and they were together until Misner's death of pancreatic cancer in 2012.

== Legislative career ==
=== 2009 appointment ===
When Senator Jennifer Veiga announced her resignation from the legislature in 2009, Steadman was one of ten candidates in the race to succeed her. A vacancy committee, composed of Democratic Party precinct officers and local elected officials, was convened to choose a replacement on May 20, 2009; Veiga endorsed Steadman for the vacancy appointment. Although Steadman placed second to former state representative Ann Ragsdale on the first round of balloting, he received the most votes in the second round and, in the third and final round, he won majority support, defeating Ragsdale by 93 votes to 63. Steadman, who was sworn into office on May 29, 2009, ran for and won the election for the final two years of Veiga's four-year term in the November 2010 legislative elections.

Like Veiga, Steadman is openly gay. He was one of eight openly LGBT members of the Colorado General Assembly, along with senators Lucía Guzmán (D–Denver) and Jessie Ulibarri (D–Commerce City), as well as representatives Mark Ferrandino (D–Denver), Paul Rosenthal (D–Denver), Dominick Moreno (D–Commerce City), Joann Ginal (D–Fort Collins) and Sue Schafer (D–Wheat Ridge).

=== The Colorado Civil Unions Act ===
In 2011, Steadman introduced the Colorado Civil Unions Act, an act to create legal recognition for same-sex and heterosexual couples more similar to marriage than allowed in existing law in Colorado. The act passed the Democratic-controlled state Senate but was blocked in a Republican-controlled House committee on March 31, 2011, before it could reach a full House vote.

See: Recognition of Same-Sex Unions in Colorado: The Colorado Civil Unions Act of 2011

In the 2012 state elections, Steadman was challenged by Republican candidate Michael Carr, in what is believed to be the first state legislative race in United States history in which both major party candidates were openly gay. Steadman defeated his opponent, and was rumored as a possible candidate for President of the State Senate due to the Democratic majority retained in the chamber.

In 2013, Steadman was honored at the White House with the Harvey Milk Champion of Change Award.
