= Elisabeth Epps =

American politician

Member of the Colorado House of Representatives from the 6th district
- In office January 9, 2023 – January 8, 2025
- Preceded by: Steven Woodrow (redistricting)
- Succeeded by: Sean Camacho

Personal details
- Born: Winston-Salem, North Carolina, U.S.
- Party: Democratic
- Education: University of Virginia (JD)

Elisabeth Epps is an American activist and politician who served one term as a member of the Colorado House of Representatives representing the 6th district. Elected in November 2022, she assumed office on January 9, 2023 and left office on January 8, 2025.

== Early life and education ==
Epps was born in Winston-Salem, North Carolina. She earned a Juris Doctor from the University of Virginia School of Law.

== Career ==
Epps is the founder of the Colorado Freedom Fund, a non-profit bail fund organization that provides financial support to individuals who are unable to post bail. She was elected to the Colorado House of Representatives in November 2022 and assumed office on January 9, 2023.

In the House District 6 Democratic primary held in June 2024, Epps was defeated by challenger Sean Camacho.

She is a member of the Democratic Socialists of America.

== Gun control ==
In 2023, Epps supported legislation that would ban assault weapons.

In 2024, Epps supported similar legislation that would ban assault weapons.
