= Wheat Ridge High School =

Location
- 9505 West 32nd Avenue; Wheat Ridge, Colorado 80033; United States; 39°45′48″N 105°6′15″W

Information
- School type: Public high school
- Established: 1896; 130 years ago
- School district: Jefferson County R-1
- CEEB code: 061450
- NCES School ID: 080480000803
- Principal: Lisa Mahannah
- Teaching staff: 51.67 (on an FTE basis)
- Grades: 9–12
- Gender: Coeducational
- Enrollment: 932 (2024–25)
- Student to teacher ratio: 18.04
- Campus type: Suburban, Large
- Colors: Blue and gold
- Athletics conference: CHSAA
- Mascot: Farmer
- Newspaper: The Haystack
- Feeder schools: Everitt Middle School
- Website: wheatridge.jeffcopublicschools.org

Wheat Ridge High School is a public secondary school in Wheat Ridge, Colorado. Part of Jefferson County Public Schools, the school enrolled 932 students in the 2024–25 academic year.

== Academics ==
=== Enrollment ===
In the 2024–25 academic year, Wheat Ridge High School enrolled 932 students and employed 51.67 classroom teachers (on a full-time equivalent basis), for a student-to-teacher ratio of 18.04.

== Extracurricular activities ==
=== Athletics ===
State championship titles:

- Baseball: 1992 (5A)
- Boys' ice hockey: 2002, 2006, 2007(5A)
- Girls' ice hockey: 2007, 2008, 2009
- Boys' basketball: 1944 (B), 1953 (A), 1963 (AAA), 1968 (AAA), 1991 (5A)
- Girls' basketball: 1977 (AAA), 1982 (4A)
- Boys' cross country: 1977 (I), 1979, 1981, (I)2007
- Girls' cross country: 1981 (I)
- Football: 1966 (AAA), 1967 (AAA), 1973 (AAA), 1994 (4A), 1996 (4A), 2006 (4A), 2008 (4A), 2010 (4A)
- Girls' golf: 1991 (team); Amy Root, 1991 (individual)
- Girls' gymnastics: 1985 (III)
- Softball: 2002 (5A), 2003 (5A), 2008 (4A), 2009 (4A), 2013 (4A)
- Girls' soccer: 2009, 2010
- Girls' swimming: 1987 (5A), 1988 (5A)
- Boys' tennis: 1991 (6A)
- Boys' track and field: 1942 (B), 1944 (B), 1945 (B), 1946 (B), 1950 (B), 1978 (AAA)
- Girls' track and field: 1978 (AAA)
- Girls' volleyball: 1987 (4A), 1990 (5A)
- Marching band: 1993 (4A), 1996
- Winter Percussion: 2004 (PSA), 2013 (PSA), 2016 (PSCA), 2017 (PSCA), 2018(PSCA)

== Notable alumni ==
- Don Alley, NFL player
- Annaleigh Ashford, Broadway actress
- Jeff Fosnes, Vanderbilt University basketball player (1972–1976), Golden State Warriors draft pick (1976), two-time NCAA Academic All-American, and Sunkist High School All-American
- Pat Frink, NBA player (Cincinnati Royals)
- Tim Gill, co-founder of Quark, Inc.; LGBT rights activist, Presidential Medal of Freedom winner
- Ray Johnson, football player
- Annie Kunz, Olympic athlete (track and field)
- Terry Kunz, NFL player
- Shayla LaVeaux, adult film actress
- Dave Logan, NFL player; football coach, radio and television host
- Nathan Marquardt, professional mixed martial arts fighter, formerly competing in the UFC
- Homer Pearson, Lieutenant Governor of Colorado
- Dean Reed, actor, director, singer, and songwriter
- Freddie Steinmark, starting safety on Texas' 1969 national championship team; author of I Play to Win, published after he lost his battle to cancer in 1971
- Don Styron, hurdler, still current world record holder in the now defunct 200 meter low hurdle race, set in 1960
