= Matthew Ball =

Matthew Ball may refer to:

- Matthew Ball (footballer) (born 1982), Australian rules footballer
- Matthew Ball (dancer) (born 1993), British dancer
- Matthew Ball (politician), American state legislator in Colorado
