= Scott Baldermann =

American politician

Member-elect of the Colorado House of Representatives from the 2nd district
- Assuming office January 2027
- Succeeding: Steven Woodrow

Personal details
- Party: Democratic

Scott Baldermann is an American politician. A member of the Democratic Party, he is the member-elect for the 2nd district of the Colorado House of Representatives.
