= Annie Kunz =

American heptathlete

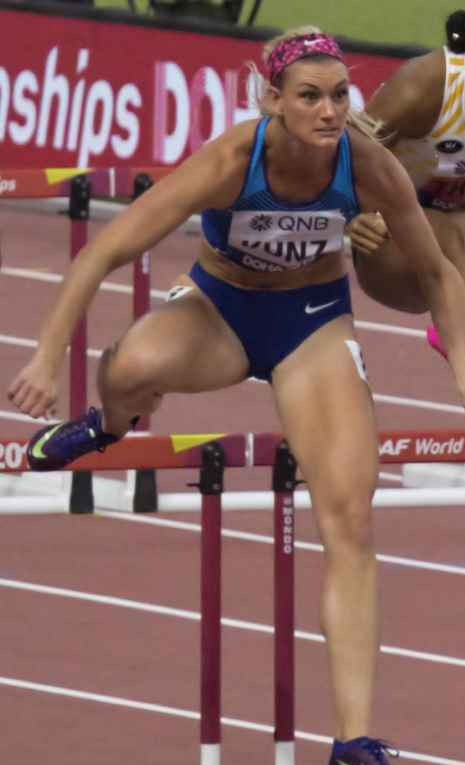
- Kunz in 2019

Personal information
- Born: Annie Elizabeth Kunz; February 16, 1993 (age 33) Denver, Colorado, U.S.
- Height: 5 ft 11 in (180 cm)

Sport
- Sport: Athletics
- Event: Heptathlon
- College team: Texas A&M Aggies track and field
- Club: Chula Vista Elite Athlete Training Center
- Turned pro: 2016
Association football career
- Position: Forward
Youth career
- Colorado Rush Nike
- 2007–2011: Wheat Ridge Farmers
College career
Years	Team	Apps	(Gls)
2011–2014	Texas A&M Aggies	97	(39)
International career
2010	United States U17		

Annie Elizabeth Kunz (born February 16, 1993) is an American track and field athlete who specializes in heptathlon. She represented United States of America at the Tokyo Olympics, 2019 World Athletics Championships, 2019 Pan American Games and two Thorpe Cups competing in women's heptathlon. She also played soccer in college for Texas A&M.

== Professional career ==
Kunz qualified to represent the United States at the 2020 Summer Olympics.

Year	Competition	Venue	Position	Event	Notes
Representing United States
2021	Summer Olympics	Tokyo, Japan	6th	Heptathlon	6420 points
2019	World Championships	Doha, Qatar	13th	Heptathlon	6067 points
2019	Pan American Games	Lima, Peru	2nd	Heptathlon	5990 points
2018	Thorpe Cup	Knoxville, United States	11th	Heptathlon	5031 points
2016	Thorpe Cup	Fayetteville, United States	11th	Heptathlon	

Year	Competition	Venue	Position	Event	Notes
Representing Texas A&M University
2016	US Olympic Trials	Eugene, Oregon	8th	Heptathlon	6038 points
Unattached
2018	USA Outdoor Track and Field Championships	Des Moines, Iowa	4th	Heptathlon	5881 points
2019	USA Indoor Track and Field Championships	Staten Island, New York	5th	Pentathlon	4243 points
2019	USA Outdoor Track and Field Championships	Des Moines, Iowa	4th	Heptathlon	6153 points
2020	USA Indoor Track and Field Championships	Annapolis, Maryland	1st	Pentathlon	4610 points
2021	US Olympic Trials	Eugene, Oregon	1st	Heptathlon	6703 points
2023	USA Outdoor Track and Field Championships	Eugene, Oregon	4th	Heptathlon	5378 points
2024	US Olympic Trials	Eugene, Oregon	DNF	Heptathlon	DNF

== NCAA ==
Kunz earned 9 All-Conference honors and NCAA Division I All-American honors in 2016 and 2013 at NCAA Division I Women's Outdoor Track and Field Championships.

== Prep ==
Kunz is a graduate of Wheat Ridge High School in Wheat Ridge, Colorado and 10-time Colorado High School Activities Association State medalist in track and field, earning six gold and four silver medals.

Kunz won four CHSAA 4A State titles as a senior in 100 hurdles 14.09 seconds, 300 hurdles in 43.30 seconds, high jump 1.575 m (5 ft 2 in) and triple jump 11.63 m (38 ft 1 3/4 in).

In 2010 as a junior, Kunz placed second at CHSAA 4A State championship in 100 hurdles 14.51 seconds, 300 hurdles 45.45 seconds and high jump 1.70 m (5 ft 6 3/4 in).

Kunz won two CHSAA 4A State titles as a sophomore in 2009 in 100 hurdles 14.37 seconds in windy conditions and high jump 1.65 m (5 ft 4 3/4 in) while finishing second in triple jump 11.51 m (37 ft 9 in).

== Personal life ==
Kunz currently resides in San Clemente, California. Her father is Super Bowl winner Terry Kunz. She also has two siblings, Kelli and Terry.
