= Chris Hansen (politician) =

American politician (born 1975)

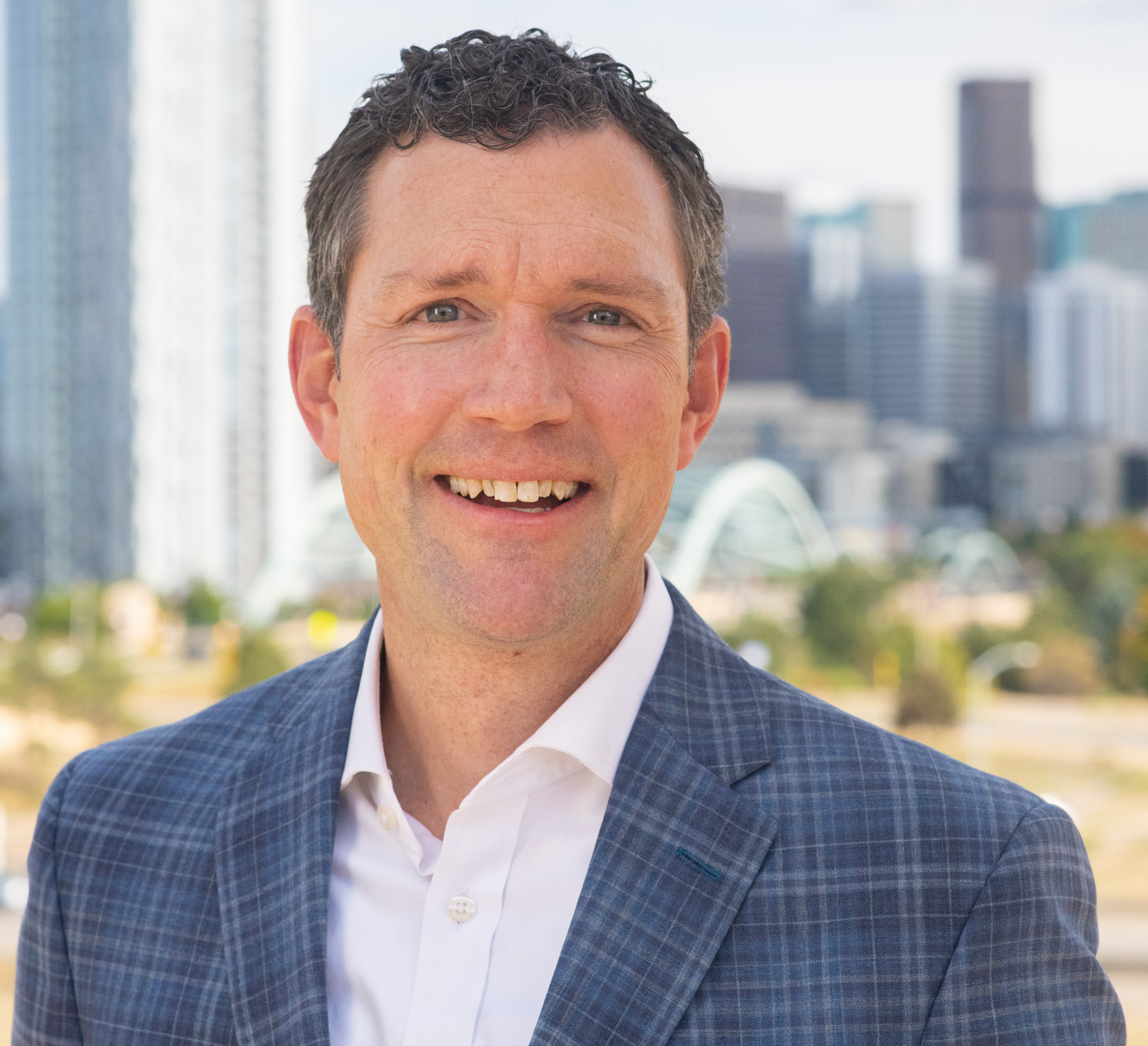

Member of the Colorado Senate from the 31st district
- In office January 21, 2020 – January 9, 2025
- Preceded by: Lois Court
- Succeeded by: Matthew Ball

Member of the Colorado House of Representatives from the 6th district
- In office January 11, 2017 – January 17, 2020
- Preceded by: Lois Court
- Succeeded by: Steven Woodrow

Personal details
- Born: Christopher Craig Hansen; June 16, 1975 (age 51) Lincoln, Nebraska, U.S.
- Party: Democratic
- Spouse: Ulcca Shashee Joshi
- Children: 2
- Education: Kansas State University (BS); University of the Witwatersrand; Massachusetts Institute of Technology (MS); Linacre College, Oxford (DPhil)
- Website: hansenforcolorado.com

Christopher Joshi Hansen (born Christopher Craig Hansen; June 16, 1975) is an American politician who represented the 31st district in the Colorado Senate as a member of the Democratic Party from 2020 to 2025. Prior to his service in the state senate he served in the Colorado House of Representatives from the 6th district from 2017 to 2020.

Hansen was born in Lincoln, Nebraska, and raised in Goodland, Kansas. He graduated from Kansas State University, University of the Witwatersrand, Massachusetts Institute of Technology, and Linacre College, Oxford. He started working at Cambridge Energy Research Associates in 2005.

Hansen was elected to the state house in the 2016 election and was reelected in the 2018 election. During his tenure in the state house he served as the chair of the Appropriations committee. A vacancy committee selected him to replace Lois Court in the state senate in 2020, and was elected in the following election. He was an unsuccessful candidate in the 2023 Denver mayoral election.

== Early life and education ==
Christopher Craig Hansen was born in Lincoln, Nebraska, on June 16, 1975, to Lana and Wallace Hansen. He was raised in Goodland, Kansas. He met Ulcca Shashee Joshi in 1998, married her on July 28, 2001, and had two children with her. Hansen later changed his middle name to Joshi.

Hansen graduated from high school in 1993. He received a B.S. in nuclear engineering in 1998 from Kansas State University, an M.S. in technology policy from the Massachusetts Institute of Technology in 2003, and a D.Phil. in economic geography from Linacre College, Oxford, in 2009. He also received a graduate diploma in civil engineering from the University of the Witwatersrand. Hansen served as president of the student body at Kansas State University from 1996 to 1997 after being elected with 57% of the vote and also served as president of the Theta Xi chapter. He started working at Cambridge Energy Research Associates in 2005.

== Colorado Legislature ==
=== Elections ===
Hansen ran for a seat in the Colorado House of Representatives from the 6th district in the 2016 election. His opponent Jeff Hart sent out campaign advertisements falsely accusing Hansen of being supported by the National Rifle Association of America and later apologized for it. Hansen accused Hart of being under investigation by the Denver district attorney for violating misinformation laws, but the district attorney told Hansen to retract his statement for violating misinformation laws. He defeated Hart in the Democratic primary and won in the general election without opposition. He was reelected in the 2018 election without opposition.

Hansen announced on October 2, 2019, that he would run to succeed Court in the state senate in the 2020 election. Court received a diagnosis of Guillain–Barré syndrome on December 31, and resigned on January 16, 2020. Attorney General Phil Weiser nominated Hansen to replace Court at the vacancy committee vote and Representative Janet Buckner seconded his nomination. Ninety-five of the one hundred twenty vacancy committee members voted for him against four other candidates on January 16, and he was sworn in on January 21. A vacancy committee voted to appoint Steven Woodrow to replace Hansen in the state house on February 4.

Hansen defeated Maria E. Orms for the Democratic nomination and won in the general election against Republican nominee Doug Townsend. Hansen and Senator Robert Rodriguez were drawn into the 22nd district following reapportionment for the 2022 election. Hansen was appointed CEO of the electrical cooperative La Plata Electric Association, which pays $400,000–$600,000, and resigned from the state senate on January 9, 2025.

=== Tenure ===
During Hansen's tenure in the state house he served as the chair of the Appropriations committee and on the Joint Budget committee. During his tenure in the state senate he has served on the Appropriations, Finance, and State, Veterans, and Military Affairs committees. He also replaced Senator Rachel Zenzinger on the Joint Budget committee before Zenzinger returned to the committee by replacing Dominick Moreno.

Hansen filed to run in the 2023 Denver mayoral election on November 14, 2022, but failed to advance to the runoff after placing sixth and endorsed Kelly Brough. He raised $623,749.37 and spent $609,576.06 during the campaign.

=== Resignation from State Senate ===
On November 12, 2024, it was announced that Hansen would resign from the start of the new session to become the CEO of La Plata Electric Association. On January 8, 2025, it was announced that Matthew Ball, Policy Director to Mayor Mike Johnston, would fill the vacancy.

== Political positions ==
Hansen sponsored legislation to change the name of Columbus Day to instead honor Frances Xavier Cabrini. He and Representative Dafna Michaelson Jenet sponsored a resolution criticizing President Donald Trump's travel ban. He support legislation to end capital punishment in Colorado. He was one of the signatories of a letter sent to Representatives Lauren Boebert and Doug Lamborn calling for them to resign for inciting the 2021 United States Capitol attack. He supported Denver's camping ban.

The Colorado Sierra Club awarded Hansen as the state legislator of the year for 2019. He received an A rating from NARAL Pro-Choice America and was endorsed by the organization in the 2018 election. He received a 100% rating from the American Civil Liberties Union in 2017, 2018, and 2019.

== Electoral history ==
2016 Colorado House of Representatives 6th district election
Primary election
Party	Candidate	Votes	%
Democratic	Chris Hansen	5,532	58.27%
Democratic	Jeff Hart	3,962	41.73%
Total votes		9,494	100.00%
General election
Democratic	Chris Hansen	32,624	100.00%
Total votes		32,624	100.00%

2018 Colorado House of Representatives 6th district election
Primary election
Party	Candidate	Votes	%
Democratic	Chris Hansen (incumbent)	15,512	100.00%
Total votes		15,512	100.00%
General election
Democratic	Chris Hansen (incumbent)	32,899	100.00%
Total votes		32,899	100.00%

2020 Colorado Senate 31st district election
Primary election
Party	Candidate	Votes	%
Democratic	Chris Hansen (incumbent)	24,439	52.72%
Democratic	Maria E. Orms	21,916	47.28%
Total votes		46,355	100.00%
General election
Democratic	Chris Hansen (incumbent)	74,288	76.70%
Republican	Doug Townsend	22,562	23.30%
Total votes		96,850	100.00%

2023 Denver mayoral election
Party	Candidate	Votes	%
Nonpartisan	Mike Johnston	42,273	24.45
Nonpartisan	Kelly Brough	34,627	20.03
Nonpartisan	Lisa Calderón	31,493	18.21
Nonpartisan	Andy Rougeot	19,927	18.21
Nonpartisan	Leslie Herod	18,506	10.70
Nonpartisan	Chris Hansen	8,309	4.81
Nonpartisan	Debbie Ortega	7,739	4.48
Nonpartisan	Ean Thomas Tafoya	2,700	1.56
Nonpartisan	Terrance Roberts	1,757	1.02
Nonpartisan	Thomas Wolf	1,747	1.01
Nonpartisan	Trinidad Rodriguez	1,240	0.72
Nonpartisan	Aurelio Martinez	755	0.44
Nonpartisan	Al Gardner	725	0.42
Nonpartisan	James Walsh	722	0.42
Nonpartisan	Renate Behrens	184	0.11
Nonpartisan	Robert Treta	169	0.10
Write-in		45	0.03
Total votes		172,918	100.00
