= Doug Linkhart =

American politician

Member of the Denver City Council from the At-Large district
- In office July 21, 2003 – July 18, 2011
- Succeeded by: Debbie Ortega; Robin Kniech

Member of the Colorado Senate from the 31st district
- In office 1995 – July 21, 2003
- Preceded by: Donald Mares
- Succeeded by: Jennifer Veiga

Member of the Colorado House of Representatives from the 2nd district
- In office 1994–1995
- Preceded by: Sean McGrath
- Succeeded by: Gloria Leyba

Personal details
- Born: December 17, 1955 (age 70) Norman, Oklahoma
- Party: Democratic

Doug Linkhart (born December 17, 1955) is an American politician who served in the Colorado House of Representatives from the 2nd district from 1994 to 1995 and in the Colorado Senate from the 31st district from 1995 to 2003. He also served on the Denver City Council from 2003 to 2011.
