= Don Alley =

American football player (1945–2020)

No. 29, 83, 19
- Positions: Wide receiver, Linebacker

Personal information
- Born: April 21, 1945; Cheyenne, Wyoming, U.S.
- Died: November 9, 2020 (aged 75)
- Listed height: 6 ft 2 in (1.88 m)
- Listed weight: 200 lb (91 kg)

Career information
- High school: Wheat Ridge (CO)
- College: Adams State (1963-1966)
- NFL draft: 1967: 16th round, 413th overall pick

Career history
- Baltimore Colts (1967); Pittsburgh Steelers (1969); San Diego Chargers (1970)*; Pennsylvania Firebirds (1970)
- * Offseason or practice squad member only

Career NFL statistics
- Receptions: 2
- Receiving yards: 27
- Stats at Pro Football Reference

Donald Wayne Alley (April 21, 1945 – November 9, 2020) was an American professional football wide receiver and linebacker in the National Football League (NFL).
