= My All American =

- Theatrical release poster
- Directed by: Angelo Pizzo
- Written by: Angelo Pizzo
- Based on: Courage Beyond the Game: The Freddie Steinmark Story by Jim Dent
- Produced by: Paul Schiff
- Starring: Aaron Eckhart; Finn Wittrock; Robin Tunney; Sarah Bolger
- Cinematography: Frank G. DeMarco
- Edited by: Dan Zimmerman
- Music by: John Paesano
- Production companies: Anthem Productions; Paul Schiff Productions
- Distributed by: Clarius Entertainment
- Release date: November 13, 2015 (United States)
- Running time: 118 minutes
- Country: United States
- Language: English
- Budget: $20 million
- Box office: $2.2 million

My All American is a 2015 American biographical drama sport film based on the life of college football player Freddie Steinmark. The film was written and directed by Angelo Pizzo. It is based on the book Courage Beyond the Game: The Freddie Steinmark Story (2012) by Jim Dent. The film stars Finn Wittrock, Sarah Bolger, Robin Tunney and Aaron Eckhart.

My All American was released on November 13, 2015, by Clarius Entertainment. The film received negative reviews from critics and was a box office bomb, grossing only $2.2 million on a $20 million budget.

That year a second biography was published of the football star, Freddie Steinmark: Faith, Family, Football.

== Plot summary ==
Taking place in the 1960s, My All American recounts the life of a young Freddie Steinmark and his dream of playing football in college. He is a strong-willed athlete with a big heart. In high school, Steinmark won the prestigious “Denver Post Gold Helmet Award” as Colorado’s top scholar-athlete. During his time on the high school football team, he meets Bobby, his best friend and teammate, and his longtime girlfriend Linda.

Despite Freddie's athletic abilities, he is smaller than most football players and is limited by his size. But his high school football coach tells Freddie that the University of Texas at Austin is interested. The Longhorns’ head coach, Darrell Royal, allows Freddie and his best friend Bobby to play collegiate football, and Linda also enrolls at the university.

Freddie and his peers face a variety of obstacles at the university and on and off the field. Bobby’s older brother dies fighting in the Vietnam War overseas, and Freddie begins to feel pain in his knee. Despite these challenges, Freddie and the Texas football team persevere, upending the team’s losing streak to win a slot in the 1969 Cotton Bowl Classic. But, Freddie is diagnosed with cancer, and has to have his leg amputated. He still supports the team standing on the sidelines on crutches.

Freddie later succumbed to cancer on June 6 1971 at the age of 22.

== Cast ==
- Finn Wittrock as Freddie Steinmark
- Sarah Bolger as Linda Wheeler
- Aaron Eckhart as Darrell Royal
- Robin Tunney as Gloria Steinmark, Freddie's mother
- Michael Reilly Burke as Fred Steinmark, Freddie's father
- Rett Terrell as Bobby Mitchell
- Juston Street as James Street
- Mackenzie Meehan as Nurse Fuller
- Kaci Beeler as Casey Addison, The Reporter
- Chace Oldmixon as Mike Campbell Defensive Backs' Coach

== Production ==
On May 7, 2014, it was announced that Wittrock had been cast in the role of Freddie Steinmark, and Aaron Eckhart had been cast in the role of coach Darrell Royal. Angelo Pizzo was announced as writer of the screenplay and was slated to direct the film. On May 16, 2014, it was announced that Sarah Bolger and Robin Tunney had been cast in the roles of Linda Wheeler and Freddie's mother Gloria Steinmark, respectively.

== Filming ==
Production of the film began on June 24, 2014, and ended on July 16, 2014. The filming was based in Texas. Scenes were shot in 7 different cities ranging from San Antonio to Austin.

== Release ==
The film was originally scheduled to be released on October 9, 2015, in the United States by Clarius Entertainment It was pushed back to November 13, 2015.

=== Home media ===
My All American was released on DVD and Blu-ray in the United States on February 23, 2016 by Universal Pictures Home Entertainment. The film made $2,962,371 in home media sales.

== Reception ==
=== Box office ===
The film opened alongside Love the Coopers and The 33. In its opening weekend, it was projected to gross $2–4 million from 1,565 theaters. The film grossed $520,000 on its opening day and $1.4 million in its opening weekend, finishing 11th at the box office.

=== Critical response ===
My All American has received generally negative reviews from critics. On Rotten Tomatoes, the film has a score of 32%, based on 44 reviews, with an average rating of 4.8/10. The site's consensus reads, "My All American has a genuinely moving real-life story to tell, but writer-director Angelo Pizzo fumbles it into manipulative, melodramatic tearjerker territory." On Metacritic, the film has a score of 34 out of 100, based on 16 critics, indicating "generally unfavorable reviews". On CinemaScore, audiences gave the film an average grade of "A" on an A+ to F scale.

Dan Callahan gave the film a negative review saying, "Even for those who love inspirational sports films might have to flinch from 'My All American', a movie so square, conservative and humorless that it winds up playing like a brutally straight-faced South Park parody of gridiron schmaltz".

== See also ==
- List of American football films
