= Freddie Steinmark: Faith, Family, Football =

2015 biography by Bower Yousse and Thomas J. Cryan

- Book cover, depicts Freddie Steinmark on the sideline of the Cotton Bowl January 1, 1970
- Authors: Bower Yousse and Thomas J. Cryan
- Language: English
- Genre: Biography
- Publisher: University of Texas Press
- Publication date: 1 September 2015
- Publication place: United States
- Media type: Print
- Pages: 287
- ISBN: 1477308210

Freddie Steinmark: Faith, Family, Football is a 2015 non-fiction biography written by Bower Yousse and Thomas J. Cryan, and is the exploration of University of Texas football player Freddie Joe Steinmark’s brief life.

== Background and summary ==
Freddie Steinmark was starting safety for the undefeated University of Texas Longhorns in 1969. In the "Game of the Century" between Arkansas and Texas, Steinmark played with pain in his left leg. Two days after the game, X-rays showed a possible tumor, and four days after that, a biopsy and surgery to amputate his leg revealed a cancerous growth. An undersized player, Steinmark had quickly become a fan favorite at Texas.

== Major themes ==
Freddie Steinmark, Faith, Family, Football addresses several aspects of living, including the application of one's practice of faith to the everyday tasks of life, in Steinmark's case, his Catholic faith, as exemplified by the discipline, commitment, and perseverance of praying the rosary daily, and in turn applying these elements to the classroom and the practice field; and then relying on that faith when facing one's mortality, in Steinmark's story, as a young man.

== Films ==
Freddie Steinmark: Faith, Family, Football coincides with the major motion picture My All American, starring Aaron Eckhart as Texas Coach Darrell Royal and Finn Wittrock as Freddie Steinmark.

== Articles ==
The Austin American Statesman, in an article by Jane Sumner, said that “The Authors . . . capture Freddie’s cheerful essence, vividly recreates key games and posits his life against the canvas of history.” The Fort Worth Star-Telegram listed the book as "New and Notable". “Will All the Pages Have a Burnt Orange Hue,” is an article by Jan Buchholz, in the Austin Business Journal, and describes the book as a chronicle of the story of the safety.
