= Colorado's 6th House of Representatives district =

American legislative district

Colorado's 6th State House of Representatives district
Representative
Sean Camacho; D–Denver
- Demographics: 67% White; 8% Black; 16% Hispanic; 3% Asian; 0% Native American; 6% Multiracial
- Population (2021): 87,293

Colorado's 6th House of Representatives district is one of 65 districts in the Colorado House of Representatives. It has been represented by Democrat Sean Camacho since 2025.

== Geography ==
District 6 is located in central Denver.

== Members ==
- Ken Gordon (until 2001)
- Andrew Romanoff (2001–2009)
- Lois Court (2009–2017)
- Chris Hansen (2017–2020)
- Steven Woodrow (2020–2023)
- Elisabeth Epps (2023–2024)
- Sean Camacho (since 2024)
- Iris Halpern (member-elect 2027)
