= Recognition of same-sex unions in Colorado =

The U.S. state of Colorado has provided limited recognition of same-sex unions in the form of designated beneficiary agreements since July 1, 2009, and as civil unions since May 1, 2013. Same-sex marriage was legalized on October 7, 2014.

Designated beneficiary agreements grant limited rights, such as hospital and jail visitation rights, control of funeral arrangements, death benefits, and the right of a surviving partner to be recognized as next of kin. Civil unions provide rights comparable to those enjoyed by married different-sex couples. When Colorado enacted civil union legislation in March 2013, effective May 1, 2013, Colorado became the third state to provide civil unions to both same-sex and different-sex couples, as Hawaii and Illinois had until both states allowed same-sex marriage in 2013.

In 2014, the Tenth Circuit Court of Appeals in the case of Kitchen v. Herbert found Utah's ban on same-sex marriage unconstitutional, but stayed its ruling pending review by the United States Supreme Court. On October 6, the Supreme Court declined to hear an appeal of that decision. The Attorney General asked the Tenth Circuit to lift a stay in a similar Colorado case, which would then require Colorado to recognize same-sex marriage.

In January 2021, the Colorado Supreme Court made a ruling to retroactively recognise common-law same-sex marriage.

== Colorado Domestic Partnership Benefits and Responsibilities Act of 2006 ==
In 2006, a voter-initiated referendum attempted to pass the Colorado Domestic Partnership Benefits and Responsibilities Act, which would have established domestic partnerships similar to a civil union, but more limited. A UCLA study of the impact domestic partnerships for same-sex couples would have on Colorado's budget concluded that allowing same-sex couples to enter into domestic partnerships under the "Colorado Domestic Partnership Benefits and Responsibilities Act" would result in a net gain of approximately $1.2 million each year for the state. This would result from savings on expenditures on state means-tested public benefits programs and from an increase in sales tax revenue from registration celebrations.

The referendum specified that a partnership is not a marriage, which "consists of the union of one man and one woman." In the November general election, the proposal was defeated by a margin of 47% for, and 53% against.

== Designated Beneficiary Agreements Act of 2009 ==
Since July 1, 2009, unmarried couples in Colorado have been able to enter a designated beneficiary agreement – similar to reciprocal beneficiary relationships in Hawaii – which grants them limited rights, including making funeral arrangements for each other, receiving death benefits, and inheriting property without a will. The law, House Bill 1260, was enacted by the legislature and is valid for estate planning, property purchases, medical decisions, and certain benefits such as life insurance and retirement-plan disbursements. It was signed by Governor Bill Ritter on April 9, 2009.

== Civil union legislation ==
=== 2011 ===
On February 14, 2011, Colorado State Senator Pat Steadman and State Representative Mark Ferrandino, both openly gay Democrats, introduced the Colorado Civil Union Act. It would have allowed both same-sex couples and different-sex couples to form unions. The act was co-sponsored by nearly all Democrats in the legislature. As first introduced, the legislation addressed financial responsibility of partners, medical decision-making and treatment, inheritance, ability to designate a partner as retirement beneficiary, the ability to adopt the child of one's partner, insurance of partner, family leave benefits, responsibility of conservator, guardian, or personal representative. A later amendment to the bill added a religious exemption, specifying that no religious official would be required to officiate at a same-sex union ceremony.

On March 24, the Democrat-controlled Senate passed the bill on a vote of 23–12, with all Senate Democrats and 3 Senate Republicans voting in favor. The Republican-controlled House defeated it in the Judiciary Committee on a 5–6 party line vote on March 31. Ferrandino believed the legislation would have passed in the House handily, citing commitments made to him by several House Republicans. Governor John Hickenlooper, a known supporter of LGBT rights when he was mayor of Denver, had indicated support for same-sex civil unions.

=== 2012 ===
The Senate passed the civil union bill by 23–12, the same vote as in 2011, on April 27, 2012. Republicans held a 33–32 majority in the House of Representatives, where a committee voted down the legislation on May 15, 2012, during a special session called to consider the legislation.

=== 2013 ===
Another version of the Colorado Civil Union Act was introduced on January 9, 2013. Unlike earlier versions of the legislation, it did not include language allowing adoption agencies to withhold their services from a couple in a same-sex civil union. On January 23, the Senate Judiciary Committee, Senate Appropriations Committee and the Senate Constitutional Committee approved the legislation with three Democrats in favor and two Republicans opposed. On February 11, the Senate Floor passed the legislation on a 21-14 vote, with all Democrats and one Republican in favor and only Republicans in opposition. A week later, the House Judiciary Committee, House Appropriations Committee and the House Constitutional Committee approved the legislation before the House Floor approved the legislation on March 12, 2013, by a vote of 39-26, with all Democrats and 2 Republicans voting for the bill and only Republicans in opposition. Governor Hickenlooper signed the legislation on March 21. The Colorado Civil Union Act allows two adults to enter a civil union "regardless of the gender of either party". The law took effect on May 1, 2013. Colorado became the ninth state to offer such a status in addition to the nine that–along with the District of Columbia–recognize same-sex marriage.

Various religious groups had very different reactions to the new law. Following the House vote, Denver's Roman Catholic Archbishop Samuel J. Aquila purported that "The ability for religious-based institutions to provide foster care and adoption services for Colorado's children is now dangerously imperiled." However, other religious groups saw no problems with the law. Lutheran Family Services, another religious-based agency that facilitates adoptions in Colorado, said it has no plans to withdraw services from Colorado in light of the bill's passage.

=== 2014 ===
Governor Hickenlooper signed a bill permitting joint state income tax filing for civil union and out-of-state same-sex married couples.

== See also ==
- LGBTQ rights in Colorado
- Same-sex marriage in Colorado
