= Terry Kunz =

American football player (born 1952)

No. 34
- Position: Running back

Personal information
- Born: October 26, 1952 (age 74); Denver, Colorado, U.S.
- Listed height: 6 ft 1 in (1.85 m)
- Listed weight: 215 lb (98 kg)

Career information
- High school: Wheat Ridge (Wheat Ridge, Colorado)
- College: Colorado (1971–1975)
- NFL draft: 1976: 8th round, 231st overall pick

Career history
- Oakland Raiders (1976–1977)

Awards and highlights
- Super Bowl champion (XI); First-team All-Big Eight (1975); Second-team All-Big Eight (1974)
- Stats at Pro Football Reference

Terry Tim Kunz (born October 26, 1952) is an American former professional football running back who played one season with the Oakland Raiders of the National Football League (NFL). He was selected by the Raiders in the eighth round of the 1976 NFL draft after playing college football for the Colorado Buffaloes football. He was a member of the Raiders team that won Super Bowl XI.

== Early life and college ==
Terry Tim Kunz was born on October 26, 1952, in Denver, Colorado. He attended Wheat Ridge High School in Wheat Ridge, Colorado.

Kunz was a member of the Colorado Buffaloes of the University of Colorado Boulder from 1971 to 1975. He was a letterman in 1972, 1974, and 1975. He rushed five times for 49 yards and one touchdown in 1972. Kunz did not play in 1973. He recorded 152 carries for 693 yards and seven touchdowns during the 1974 season while also catching eight passes for 76 yards and two touchdowns, earning Associated Press (AP) second-team All-Big Eight honors. He rushed 160 times for 882 yards and ten touchdowns his senior year in 1976 while catching 11 passes for 104 yards and one touchdown, garnering AP and United Press International first-team All-Big Eight recognition.

== Professional career ==
Kunz was selected by the Oakland Raiders in the eighth round, with the 231st overall pick, of the 1976 NFL draft. He played in seven games for the Raiders during the 1976 season, totaling four rushing attempts for 33 yards. On January 9, 1977, the Raiders won Super Bowl XI against the Minnesota Vikings by a score of 32–14. Kunz did not play in the game. He was placed on injured reserve on August 10, 1977, due to a knee injury and missed the entire 1977 season.

== Personal life ==
Kunz later worked in real estate and construction. His daughter Annie Kunz was a member of the USA track and field team at the 2020 Summer Olympics.
