= Iris Halpern =

American politician

Member-elect of the Colorado House of Representatives from the 6th district
- Assuming office January 2027
- Succeeding: Sean Camacho

Personal details
- Party: Democratic
- Website: www.iris4colorado.org

Iris Halpern is an American politician. A member of the Democratic Party, she is the member-elect for the 6th district of the Colorado House of Representatives. She was endorsed by the Working Families Party. She is a civil rights attorney. She is LGBTQ.
