= Steven Woodrow =

American politician

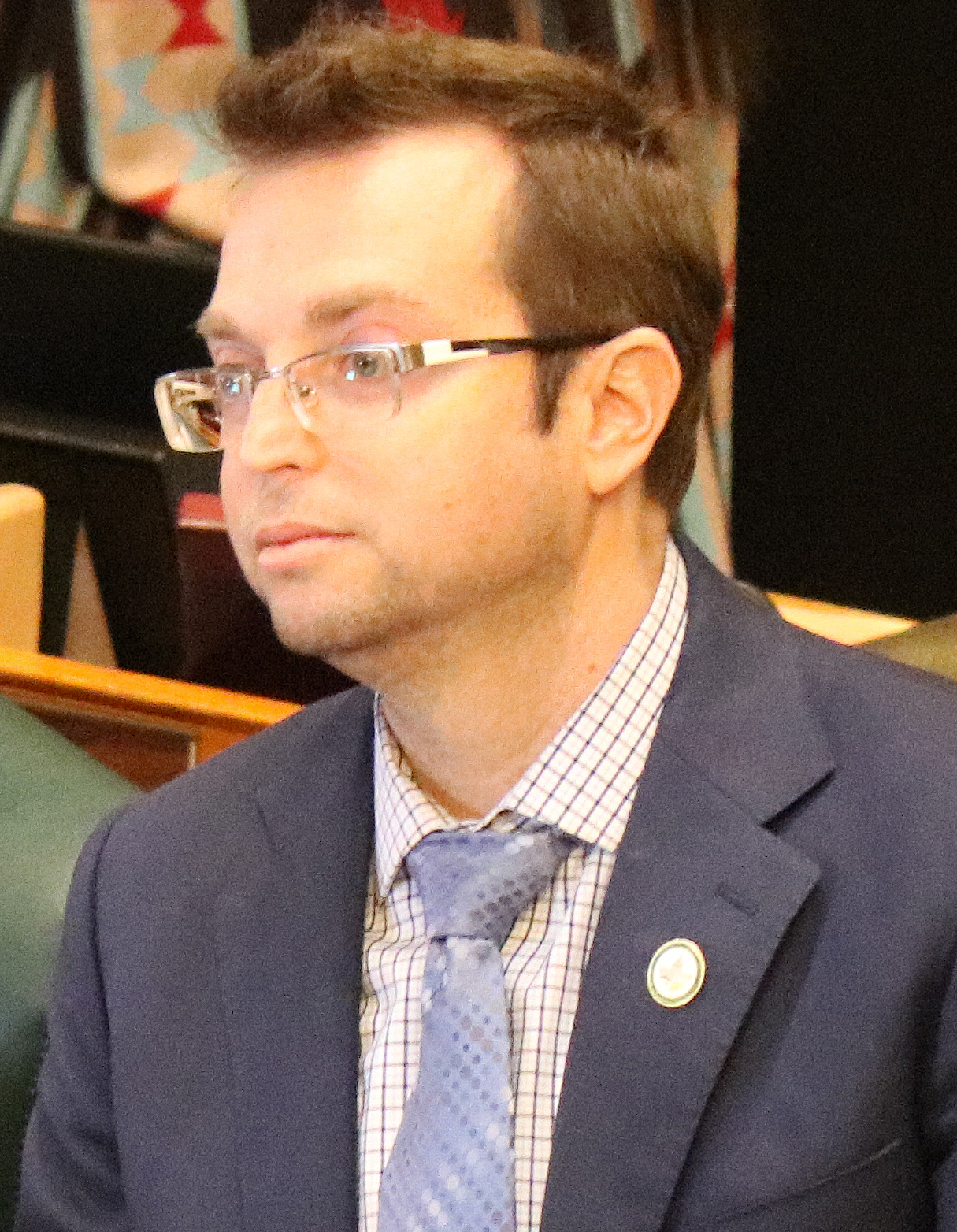
- Woodrow in 2020

Member of the Colorado House of Representatives
- Incumbent
- Assumed office February 4, 2020
- Preceded by: Chris Hansen
- Succeeded by: Scott Baldermann (elect)
- Constituency: 6th district (2020–2023); 2nd district (2023–present)

Personal details
- Party: Democratic
- Education: University of Michigan; Chicago-Kent College of Law

Steven Lezell Woodrow is an American politician who currently serves as a member of the Colorado House of Representatives. A member of the Colorado Democratic Party, he previously served in Colorado's 6th district from 2020 to 2023 and the Chair of the House Finance Committee.

== Early life and education ==
Woodrow spent his early life in Michigan. His mother taught public school at Bingham Farms elementary in Michigan. He attended the University of Michigan with his sisters, where he majored in political science and earned his Bachelor of Arts with Distinction in 2002. During undergrad he served as President of the Alpha-Theta chapter of the Delta Sigma Phi fraternity. Later, in 2005, Woodrow earned a J.D. from the Chicago-Kent College of Law with high honors. During law school he served as President of the Chicago-Kent Student Bar Association.

== Career ==
Woodrow, along with Patrick H. Peluso, co-founded the law firm Woodrow & Peluso. With this firm, Woodrow practices law in Denver, Colorado. In January 2020, Chris Hansen resigned from the Colorado House of Representatives to fill Lois Court's vacancy in the Colorado Senate. While the Democratic Party committee was searching for a replacement, state senator Robert Rodriguez backed Woodrow. Woodrow was appointed to the Colorado House of Representatives seat representing the 6th district, and was seated on February 4, 2020. Due to redistricting, Woodrow was drawn out of the 6th district and placed in the 2nd district. Woodrow won re-election in the 2022 general election.

Woodrow's policy focus during his first campaign was on affordable housing, education and gun control.

As State Representative, Woodrow used his position to ensure large payouts to himself and other trial lawyers for class action lawsuits that would otherwise not move forward. Prior to the passage of House Bill 22–1071, “Damages in Class Actions Consumer Protection Act,” it was up to the Colorado Attorney General to initiate claims on behalf of injured consumers for violations of Colorado's consumer protection laws. Woodrow was the sponsor of this bill and has since initiated multiple class action lawsuits which have earned him millions in fees.

Woodrow also argued that legislators should not be subject to the law, citing legislative privilege to avoid prosecution for speeding violations.

== Personal life ==
Woodrow has two children. He and his family are members of the Rodef Shalom Congregation.

Woodrow gained significant attention on July 13, 2024, when he posted on X in response to the attempted assassination of Donald Trump earlier that day: "The last thing America needed was sympathy for the devil but here we are." His post was widely criticized, including by the Colorado Democratic Party; Afterwards, he told the Washington Examiner that he condemned the events that day "on the strongest terms" and that the shooting "risks portraying Trump [as] a martyr, thus making him more likely to win in November."

== Elections ==
=== 2020 ===
Woodrow defeated challengers Steven Paletz and Dan Himelspach in the Democratic Primary. He went on to win the general election, defeating Republican William McAleb and Libertarian Jeffrey Crowe with 71.9% of the vote.

=== 2022 ===
Woodrow defeated Republican Stephanie Wheeler and Libertarian Justin Savoy with 74.4% of the vote in the 2022 general election.

=== 2026 ===
In August 2025, Woodrow announced that he will not be seeking reelection in 2026.
