= Sean Camacho =

American politician

Member of the Colorado House of Representatives from the 6th district
- Incumbent
- Assumed office January 8, 2025
- Preceded by: Elisabeth Epps
- Succeeded by: Iris Halpern (elect)

Personal details
- Party: Democratic

Sean Camacho is an American politician who was elected as the representative for the 6th district of the Colorado House of Representatives in 2024.

In 2026, Camacho ran for re-election. However, in the Democratic primary election held June 30, 2026, he was defeated by attorney Iris Halpern.
