= Ray Johnson (American football) =

American football player (1914–1990)

No. 12, 7, 29
- Positions: Defensive back, tailback

Personal information
- Born: October 16, 1914; Denver, Colorado, U.S.
- Died: August 20, 1990 (aged 75); Topeka, Kansas, U.S.
- Listed height: 6 ft 1 in (1.85 m)
- Listed weight: 195 lb (88 kg)

Career information
- High school: Wheat Ridge (Wheat Ridge, Colorado)
- College: Denver (1933–1936)
- NFL draft: 1937: 9th round, 90th overall pick

Career history
- Cleveland Rams (1937–1938); Chicago Bears (1938); St. Louis Gunners (1938–1939); Chicago Cardinals (1940); Columbus Bullies (1940)

Career NFL statistics
- Rushing yards: 28
- Rushing average: 4
- Passing yards: 45
- TD–INT: 0-1
- Stats at Pro Football Reference

Raymond Robert Johnson (October 16, 1914 – August 20, 1990) was an American professional football player who played three seasons in the National Football League (NFL) with the Cleveland Rams and Chicago Cardinals. He was selected by the Rams in the ninth round of the 1937 NFL draft after playing college football at the University of Denver.

== Early life and college ==
Raymond Robert Johnson was born on October 16, 1914, in Denver, Colorado. He attended Wheat Ridge High School in Wheat Ridge, Colorado.

He was a member of the Denver Pioneers from 1933 to 1936 and was a three-year letterman from 1934 to 1936.

== Professional career ==
Johnson was selected by the Cleveland Rams in the ninth round, with the 90th overall pick, of the 1937 NFL draft. He played in two games, both starts during the Rams' inaugural 1937 season, rushing seven times for 28 yards. He appeared in one game in 1938, completing three of five passes for 45 yards and one interception. Johnson was released in 1938.

Johnson signed with the Chicago Bears of the NFL in 1938 but was released later that year.

He played in two games, starting one, for the St. Louis Gunners of the American Football League in 1938, scoring one rushing touchdown. He appeared in all nine games, starting four, for the Gunners during the 1939 season, scoring five rushing touchdowns and one passing touchdown.

Johnson signed with the NFL's Chicago Cardinals in 1940. He played in the team's first game of the 1940 season before being released on September 11, 1940.

He played in all ten games, starting eight, for the Columbus Bullies of the American Football League in 1940, scoring one rushing touchdown, one passing touchdown, and one interception return touchdown.

== Personal life ==
Johnson died on August 20, 1990, in Topeka, Kansas.
