= Pat Frink =

American basketball player (1945–2012)

Personal information
- Born: February 18, 1945 Wheat Ridge, Colorado, U.S.
- Died: May 6, 2012 (aged 67) Tucson, Arizona, U.S.
- Listed height: 6 ft 4 in (1.93 m)
- Listed weight: 195 lb (88 kg)

Career information
- High school: Wheat Ridge (Wheat Ridge, Colorado)
- College: Colorado (1965–1968)
- NBA draft: 1968: 3rd round, 27th overall pick
- Drafted by: Cincinnati Royals
- Playing career: 1968–1969
- Position: Shooting guard
- Number: 17

Career history
- 1968–1969: Cincinnati Royals
- Stats at NBA.com
- Stats at Basketball Reference

Patrick Edward Frink (February 18, 1945 – May 6, 2012) was an American basketball player. He played one season in the National Basketball Association (NBA).

== Early life ==
Pat Frink grew up in Wheat Ridge, Colorado, in a single-parent family with his older brother, Mike, and their mother, Madge, who worked several jobs at a time. The brothers never knew their father.

Frink attended Wheat Ridge High School, where he starred as a 6'4" shooting guard. He earned all-state honor and all American honors.

== College career ==
He played collegiately at the University of Colorado from 1965 to 1968. There he played alongside his older brother, Mike Frink. For his career, he scored 1,288 points (17.4 per game) and grabbed 251 rebounds (3.4 per game). He led the team in scoring all three seasons he played for the Buffs.

He was named second team All-Big Eight Conference his junior and senior years and was a second team Academic All-American in 1968.

== NBA career ==
Following his graduation from Colorado, Frink was drafted by the Cincinnati Royals in the third round (27th pick) of the 1968 NBA draft. He played one season for the Royals, appearing in 48 games and averaging 2.1 points per game in 1968–69. He scored a career single-game best 17 points on January 9, 1969, against the Seattle SuperSonics. An ankle injury kept him out of the next season, and his NBA career was over.

One of his teammates was legendary hall-of-famer Oscar Robertson who, despite playing with Frink for only one season, became lifelong friends with Frink and appeared at basketball camps run by Pat and Mike Frink.

== Personal life ==
After his basketball career ended, he focused on caring for his daughter, Kody, who was born with Rett syndrome and had a life expectancy of about seven years. She was 21 when she died in 2000.

He lived on a ranch in Tucson, Arizona, and taught classes at an Indian reservation school. He ran a homeless shelter in Denver for 15 years, and pastored the homebound and hospitalized elderly Catholic community in Boulder as a layman at Sacred Heart Church for 12 years.

Frink died on May 6, 2012, in a single-vehicle accident outside Tucson, Arizona. He was 67. He was buried near his mother and daughter at the family cemetery on his ranch.

Pat Frink was survived by four sons, Shane, Gant, Garrett and Dylan, one daughter, Shalom, and eight grandchildren; Maxwell, Madalyn, Caleb, Mackenzie and four others.

== Career statistics ==
Legend
GP	Games played	GS	Games started	MPG	Minutes per game
FG%	Field goal percentage	3P%	3-point field goal percentage	FT%	Free throw percentage
RPG	Rebounds per game	APG	Assists per game	SPG	Steals per game
BPG	Blocks per game	PPG	Points per game	**Bold**	Career high

=== NBA ===
==== Regular season ====
Year	Team	GP	MPG	FG%	FT%	RPG	APG	PPG
1968–69	Cincinnati	48	7.6	.340	.793	.9	1.1	2.6
