= Lois Court =

American politician

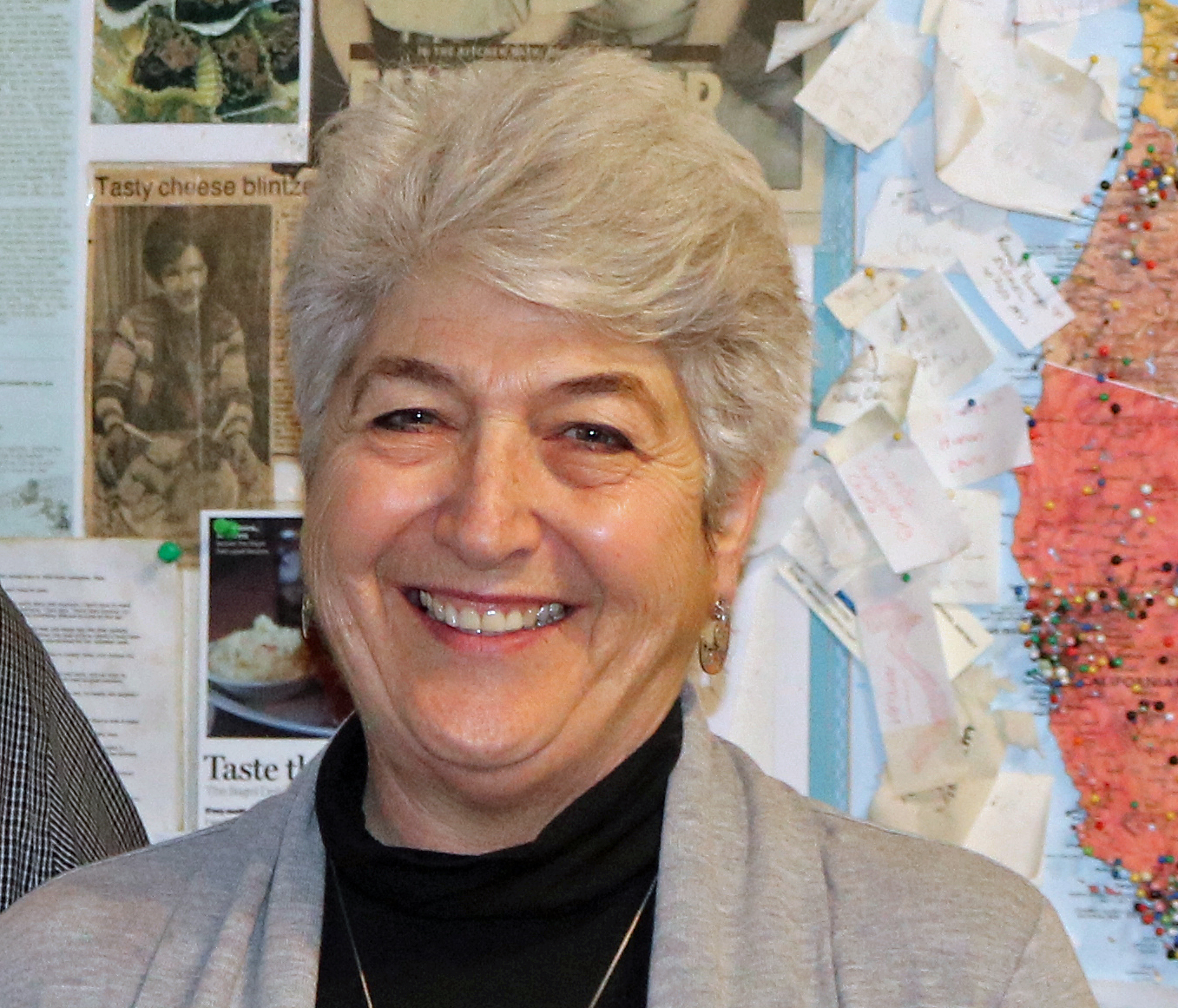

President pro tempore of the Colorado Senate
- In office January 4, 2019 – January 16, 2020
- Preceded by: Jerry Sonnenberg
- Succeeded by: Nancy Todd

Member of the Colorado Senate from the 31st district
- In office January 11, 2017 – January 16, 2020
- Preceded by: Pat Steadman
- Succeeded by: Chris Hansen

Member of the Colorado House of Representatives from the 6th district
- In office January 7, 2009 – January 11, 2017
- Preceded by: Andrew Romanoff
- Succeeded by: Chris Hansen

Personal details
- Born: 1949 (age 76–77) Washington, D.C., U.S.
- Party: Democratic
- Spouse: Patrick Reynolds
- Children: 2
- Education: University of Colorado, Denver (BA, MPA)

Lois Court is a former legislator in the U.S. state of Colorado. Initially elected to the Colorado House of Representatives as a Democrat in 2008, Court represented House District 6 from 2009 through 2016, and was elected to the Colorado Senate in 2016. Court represented State Senate District 31, which encompasses portions of central and southeast Denver, Colorado. Court resigned from the senate on January 16, 2020, after being diagnosed with Guillain-Barré syndrome in early 2020. She served as the President Pro Tempore of the Colorado State Senate from January 2019 until her resignation from the senate in 2020.

== Education ==
Lois Court earned a Master of Public Administration in 1996 from the Graduate School of Public Affairs, University of Colorado at Denver. She earned her Bachelor of Arts degree in 1975 from the University of Colorado at Denver.

== Personal ==
Lois Court is married to Patrick Reynolds and has two sons, Nathan and Brendan. She has lived in the 7th Avenue Parkway Neighborhood and has been active in Denver/State civics, public school, and community affairs for over 25 years. Prior to becoming a legislator, she served as Denver Mayor Wellington Webb's Director of Administration, General Services Department; Director of the Mayor's Office of Volunteerism; and Director of the Mayor's Office of Neighborhood Response. Court also served as a legislative staffer for a member of the Colorado General Assembly during which time she became familiar with legislative procedures.

She also has over 20 years of experience as a public issues consultant, and is a former American Government and Political Science Adjunct Instructor at the Red Rocks Community College.

== Legislative career ==
=== 2008 Election ===
Lois Court defeated Liz Adams and Josh Hanfling in the contested Democratic primary in August, taking 44 percent of votes cast.

Court faced Republican Joshua Sharf in the November 2008 general election. Her candidacy was endorsed by the Denver Post, and she ultimately won the November general election with 68 percent of the popular vote.

=== 2009 legislative session ===
For the 2009 legislative session, Court was named to seats on the House Services Committee, the House Judiciary Committee, and the House State, Veterans, and Military Affairs Committee.

In her first legislative session, Court sponsored legislation to require carbon monoxide detectors in new homes and rental units.

=== 2010 legislative session ===
For the 2010 legislative session, Court continued in her positions on the House Services Committee, the House Judiciary Committee, and the House State, Veterans, and Military Affairs Committee. In her second legislative session, Court co-sponsored Senate Bill 10-228 to eliminate the arbitrary allocation cap for the General Fund so Colorado could recover more quickly from the recession.

=== 2010 Election ===
Court again faced Republican Joshua Sharf in the November 2010 general election. Even in a Republican year, she won the November general election with 64 percent of the popular vote.

=== 2011 legislative session ===
In the 2011 legislative session the Democrats were in a slim minority: 33 Republicans, 32 Democrats in the State House. Court served as a member of the House State, Veterans, and Military Affairs Committee, The House Judiciary Committee and the House Services Committee. In addition, she was elected by her Democratic colleagues to serve as Minority Caucus Chair. As Caucus Chair she is a member of the Democratic leadership team and organizes caucus gatherings and chairs discussions.

Her major piece of legislation in 2011 was SCR 11-001, a concurrent resolution to increase the threshold for constitutional change in Colorado.

=== 2012 legislative session ===
In the 2012 legislative session the Democrats were in a slim minority: 33 Republicans, 32 Democrats in the State House. Court served as a member of the House State, Veterans, and Military Affairs Committee, The House Judiciary Committee and the House Services Committee. In addition, she was re-elected by her Democratic colleagues to serve as Minority Caucus Chair. As Caucus Chair she is a member of the Democratic leadership team and organizes caucus gatherings and chairs discussions.

Her major piece of legislation in 2012 was HCR 12-1003: Concerning our State Constitution and Raising the Standards Required for Changing It. This concurrent resolution would have changed the way and ease with which the Colorado Constitution can be changed.

=== 2012 election ===
In the 2012 General Election, Representative Court faced Republican challenger Robert Hardaway. Court was elected by a margin of 67% to 30%.

=== 2013 legislative session ===
In the 2013 legislative session the Democrats were in the majority: 37 Democrats, 28 Republicans in the State House. Court served as Chair of the House Finance Committee and as a member of The House Judiciary Committee and the House Services Committee. In addition, she was re-elected by her Democratic colleagues to serve as majority Caucus Chair. As Caucus Chair she is a member of the Democratic leadership team and organizes caucus gatherings and chairs discussions.

Court had two major pieces of legislation in 2013. HB 13-1228: Payment for Background Checks for Gun Transfers - this bill imposes a small fee, around $12, for performing an instant criminal background check upon the purchaser of a gun. Previously, the state provided a subsidy to gun purchasers for this fee.

Her other major piece of legislation was SB 13-226: The Dog Protection Act. This bill aims to reduce the number of dogs shot by officers of municipal police departments and sheriffs' offices by requiring local law enforcement agencies to develop training programs to prepare local law enforcement officers for encounters with dogs in the line of duty. This training will emphasize how to recognize common dog behaviors and how to employ nonlethal methods to control or respond to dogs.

Colorado Senate
Preceded by Jerry Sonnenberg	President pro tempore of the Colorado Senate; 2019–2020	Succeeded by Nancy Todd
