= Mike Cerbo =

American politician

Member of the Colorado House of Representatives from the 2nd district
- In office January 8, 2003 – September 10, 2007
- Succeeded by: Mark Ferrandino

Personal details
- Born: October 17, 1953 (age 72) Darby, Pennsylvania
- Party: Democratic

Mike Cerbo (born October 17, 1953) is an American politician who served in the Colorado House of Representatives from the 2nd district from 2003 to 2007.
