= Dave Logan (American football) =

American football player (born 1954)

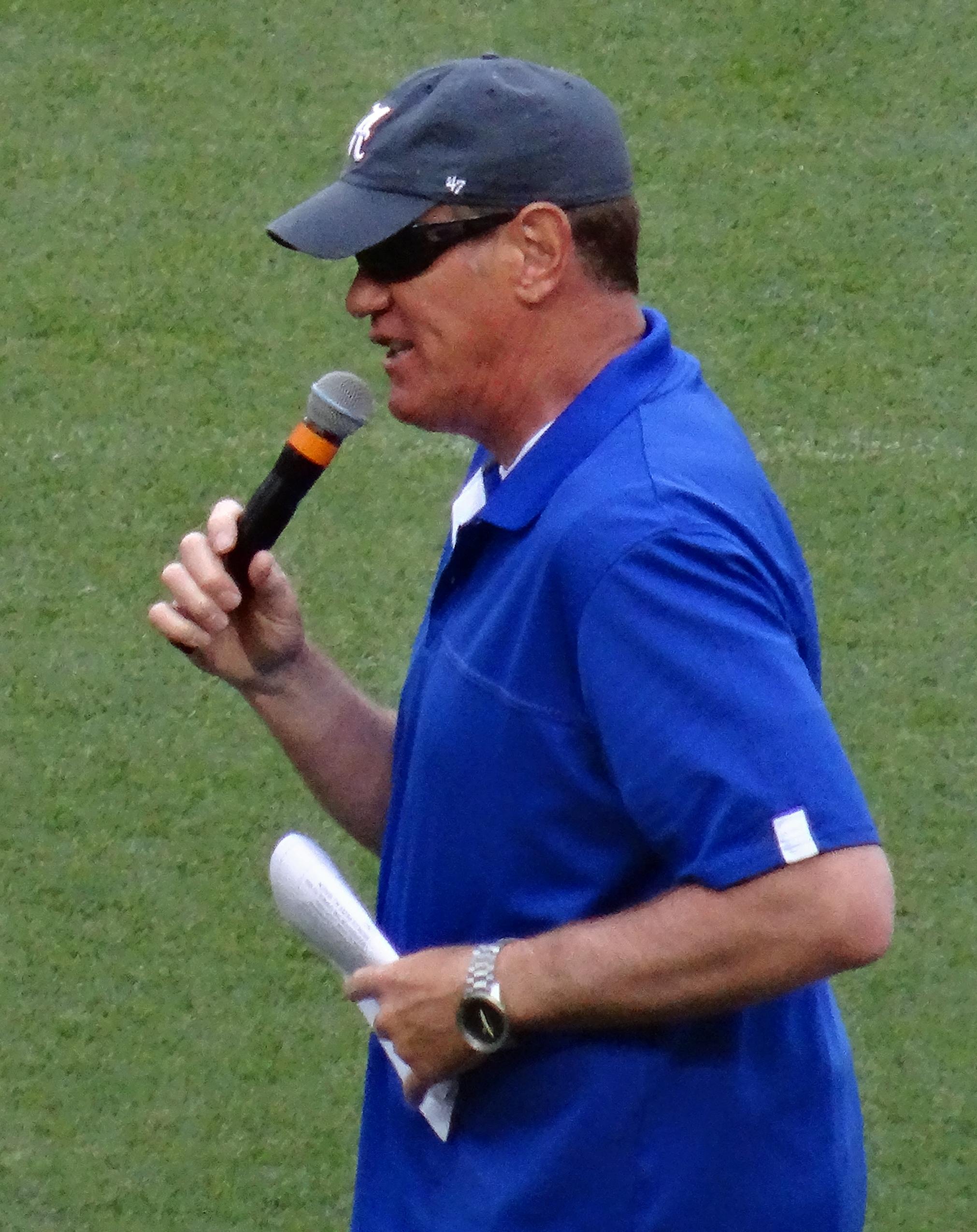
- Logan in 2013

No. 85, 89
- Position: Wide receiver

Personal information
- Born: February 2, 1954 (age 72); Fargo, North Dakota, U.S.
- Listed height: 6 ft 5 in (1.96 m)
- Listed weight: 219 lb (99 kg)

Career information
- High school: Wheat Ridge (Wheat Ridge, Colorado)
- College: Colorado
- NFL draft: 1976: 3rd round, 65th overall pick

Career history
- Cleveland Browns (1976–1983); Denver Broncos (1984)

Awards and highlights
- Second-team All-Big Eight (1973)

Career NFL statistics
- Receptions: 263
- Receiving yards: 4,250
- Receiving touchdowns: 24
- Stats at Pro Football Reference

David Russell Logan (born February 2, 1954) is an American radio personality, high school football coach and former professional player. Logan played as a wide receiver for nine seasons in the National Football League (NFL) from 1976 to 1984, primarily for the Cleveland Browns. He has been the voice of Denver Broncos football for 29 years, serving as the team's color analyst for six seasons prior to sliding into the play-by-play role. He has been a major voice on 850 KOA radio in Denver for nearly 30 years, and in 2016 was the key on-air figure when iHeartMedia launched the radio station Denver Sports 760.

As of 2022, Logan had coached more than 30 seasons of high school football. He is the only high school coach to win 10 titles with 4 different schools. In 2021, he was inducted into the National Federation of State High School Associations Hall of Fame. Logan is one of only six players, along with Dave Winfield and Mickey McCarty, to be drafted by the NBA, NFL, and MLB.

== Player ==
Logan was an All-State football player at Wheat Ridge High School. While in high school, he won The Denver Post's Gold Helmet Award. An award for the state's top senior football player, scholar and citizen. Out of high school, Logan was drafted by the Cincinnati Reds in the 19th round as a pitcher/infielder.

Logan instead chose to attend the University of Colorado where he lettered in both basketball and football. In 1974, he was selected by Playboy as a Pre-season All-American. In 1975, he was selected by The Sporting News as an All-American. In 1976, he was drafted by the NBA's Kansas City Kings in the ninth round (143rd overall pick) and by the Cleveland Browns in the third round.

Logan played for the Cleveland Browns (1976–83) and the Denver Broncos (1984). As a Cleveland Brown, Logan ranked among the top 5 in "virtually every receiving category in the franchise record books."

== NFL career statistics ==
Legend
**Bold**	Career high

=== Regular season ===
Year	Team	Games		Receiving				
Year	Team	GP	GS	Rec	Yds	Avg	Lng	TD
1976	CLE	14	0	5	104	**20.8**	52	0
1977	CLE	14	5	19	284	14.9	42	1
1978	CLE	**16**	**16**	37	585	15.8	44	4
1979	CLE	**16**	**16**	**59**	**982**	16.6	46	**7**
1980	CLE	**16**	**16**	51	822	16.1	**65**	4
1981	CLE	14	14	31	497	16.0	40	4
1982	CLE	9	9	23	346	15.0	56	2
1983	CLE	**16**	13	37	627	16.9	34	2
1984	DEN	4	0	1	3	3.0	3	0
		119	89	263	4,250	16.2	65	24

=== Playoffs ===
Year	Team	Games		Receiving				
Year	Team	GP	GS	Rec	Yds	Avg	Lng	TD
1980	CLE	**1**	**1**	**2**	**36**	18.0	21	0
1982	CLE	**1**	**1**	1	27	**27.0**	**27**	0
		2	2	3	63	21.0	27	0

== Radio personality ==
After leaving football, Logan began a career in radio. Logan joined the Denver Broncos radio booth in 1990, initially serving as a color analyst before shifting to play-by-play in 1996. He, and KRFX morning-drive host Rick Lewis currently call the Broncos games on 850 KOA radio.

From 1993 to 2005, Logan and Scott Hastings hosted "The Zoo" on 850 KOA. After Hastings's departure from the show, Logan continued to broadcast during the same time period with other radio personalities. From 2005 to 2011, Logan and Lois Melkonian hosted a show in the same time period called "The Ride Home." In 2011 Melkonian moved to Houston and the show was renamed the "Dave Logan Show." He then was paired with Dave Krieger and later with Susie Wargin through 2015.

Logan was the host of the "Logan and Lewis" show (weekdays, 9AM to 12PM) until September 17, 2021, on KOA. He co-hosted the show with Rick Lewis and Kathy Lee. Logan moved to a program rechristened The Denver Sports Zoo for the 3 to 6 p.m. shift, which had been helmed by Alfred Williams and JoJo Turnbeaugh, but now spotlights Williams and Logan kicking off September 20, 2022.

Logan was the 1997 Broadcast Citizen of the Year in Colorado, and has won Colorado Sportscaster of the Year five times (1992, 1993, 1998, 2017 and 2025).

== Coaching ==
Despite being a full-time radio personality, Logan began coaching high school football in 1993 at Arvada West. He then moved to Chatfield in 2000 and to J. K. Mullen High School in 2003. As of 2017, Logan had taken his teams to the playoffs 22 times and won thirteen state championships in 24 seasons of coaching.

On January 11, 2012, Mullen's president and CEO Ryan Clement announced that Logan would no longer be coaching the team because the school wanted a coach "who can be a full-time member of the school community and be engaged in every facet." Days after his firing, Mullen High School self-reported various recruiting violations to the Colorado High School Athletic Association. In August 2012, the CHSAA concluded its investigation by placing Mullen on a one-year probation and cleared Logan of any wrongdoing. Mullen officials also indicated the infractions were not related to the firing. Two weeks after being fired from Mullen, Logan was hired to coach football at Mullen's rival Cherry Creek High School; Logan's team there won the 5A state championship in 2014, 2019, 2020, 2021, 2022, 2024, and 2025.

Logan is the only person in Colorado prep history to coach Division 5A championship football teams at four different schools. He is known for donating his coaching salary to his assistant coaches.

== Other ==
Logan was inducted into the Colorado Sports Hall of Fame in 2000.

In 2009, Logan launched TeamDaveLogan.com, a web-based consumer referral network of home improvement providers.
