= Samuel M. Reed =

American businessman

Samuel Marvin Reed (October 9, 1900 – February 6, 1996) was an American businessman. He was the founder and chief executive officer of Reed Speaker Company, which made car window speakers for drive-in theaters.

Reed was born in Indiana on October 9, 1900. His parents' names were Samuel and Lulu.

Reed became a salesman of radio equipment in 1940. He founded Reed Speaker Company in the late 1950s to early 1960s. Based in Golden, Colorado, the company produced drive-in speakers until the late 1970s. Five patents about drive-in speakers were filed in Reed's name.

He married Edna Thomas in 1925. As of 1940, the year of the latest census released, he had two children: Kenneth B. Reed, his son, and daughter Bernadette M. Reed West.

She died in 1993; he died in 1996, at age 95, in Colorado. The cause of death was pneumonia, after a fall resulting in a broken hip.
