= Mark Ferrandino =

American fiscal analyst and politician from Colorado

Speaker of the Colorado House of Representatives
- In office January 9, 2013 – January 7, 2015
- Preceded by: Frank McNulty
- Succeeded by: Dickey Lee Hullinghorst

Minority Leader of the Colorado House of Representatives
- In office January 12, 2011 – January 9, 2013
- Preceded by: Mike May
- Succeeded by: Brian DelGrosso

Member of the Colorado House of Representatives from the 2nd district
- In office October 1, 2007 – January 7, 2015
- Preceded by: Mike Cerbo
- Succeeded by: Alec Garnett

Personal details
- Born: Mark Steven Ferrandino; August 9, 1977 (age 49) Nyack, New York, U.S.
- Party: Democratic
- Spouse: Gregory Wertsch
- Education: University of Rochester (BA, MPP)
- Website: Official website

Mark Steven Ferrandino (born August 9, 1977) is a former legislator in the U.S. state of Colorado and former Speaker of the Colorado House of Representatives. Appointed to the legislature in 2007, Ferrandino represented House District 2, encompassing south central Denver from 2012 to 2014. He is the first openly gay male legislator in Colorado history. He did not seek re-election in 2014, and was the chief financial officer of Denver Public Schools. On November 19, 2020, Colorado Governor Jared Polis appointed Ferrandino to serve as executive director of the Colorado Department of Revenue. He served in the position until July 2023, when the governor named him director of the Office of State Planning and Budgeting.

== Biography ==
Ferrandino, the son of two Italian-American public school teachers, was born in Nyack, New York. He was born with oxygen deprivation and had to have surgery because he was cross eyed. Suffering from multiple learning difficulties, he took special education classes until the fourth grade. He later joined mainstream classes, played the trumpet and captained his high school track team. Ferrandino graduated from Clarkstown High School South in 1995 and earned a bachelor's degree in political science and economics in 1999 and a master's degree in public policy analysis in 2000 both from the University of Rochester. While in school, Ferrandino was a collegiate pole vaulter.

He began his political career in 1997, spending a semester as intern for Congressman Chuck Schumer of New York. After working for several years in Washington, D.C., as a program analyst for the United States Department of Justice Office of the Inspector General, and as a policy analyst for the White House Office of Management and Budget, Ferrandino relocated to Colorado when his partner, Gregory, took a job with the U.S. Customs Service. He now lives in the Baker neighborhood of Denver and is a member of the Baker Historic Neighborhood Association. Ferrandino has played the trumpet since the fourth grade and continues to play regularly.

Ferrandino worked as a senior budget analyst in the Colorado Department of Health Care and Financing from 2005 until his legislative appointment in 2007. He was also active in Democratic Party politics as treasurer of the Colorado Democratic Party and co-captain for Colorado House District 2A. Ferrandino was named Colorado Young Democrat of the Year in 2007. He is also a former co-chairman of the Colorado Stonewall Democrats, and served on the board of directors for the National Stonewall Democrats.

Ferrandino is a twin, and younger brother. His twin Nicole is a business analyst for the University of Colorado Denver and his older brother Micheal is a surgeon at Duke Medical Center in North Carolina. He has two nieces and nephews, Abbey and Owen who live in CO, as well as Hayden and John in NC. He has an adopted daughter with his spouse Gregory Wertsch and they live in the Baker community of Denver.

== Legislative career ==
=== 2007 legislative appointment ===
In September 2007, Rep. Mike Cerbo resigned from the legislature in order to become director of the Colorado AFL-CIO. Ferrandino was elected to Cerbo's seat in the Colorado House of Representatives in September 2007 by the 2nd District Vacancy Committee on a vote of 23–3. Both Ferrandino and his opponent in the vacancy election, Doug Williams, were openly gay; Ferrandino became the first openly gay man to serve in the Colorado General Assembly. He served as one of four openly LGBT members of the legislature, alongside Sens. Pat Steadman (D–Denver) and Lucía Guzmán (D–Denver), as well as Rep. Sue Schafer (D–Wheat Ridge).

Ferrandino was sworn into the legislature on October 1, 2007, and was elected to a full term in November 2008. Assuming he is re-elected at two-year intervals, term limits will prevent him seeking a fifth House term in 2014, despite the fact that he would not have served four full terms.

Ferrandino has declared his legislative priorities to include health care, consumer protection, and TABOR reform.

=== 2008 legislative session ===
For his first legislative session, in 2008, Ferrandino was named to the House Business Affairs and Labor Committee and the House State, Veterans and Military Affairs Committee. Ferrandino has named health care and education as his top legislative priorities.

For the 2008 legislative session, Ferrandino is exploring regulation requiring greater transparency and guaranteed lifetimes for gift cards, and plans to sponsor a bill to direct funds from fines collected from scammers to educate the public about consumer scams. Ferrandino has also sponsored a bill to allow some lesser criminal convictions to be sealed from public inspection.

He has also proposed, with Rep. Sara Gagliardi, the "American Dream Protection Act of 2008," which would allow judges to delay home foreclosures by 90 days, in response to the ongoing subprime mortgage crisis. The bill was amended in the legislature to only increase public outreach efforts and notification requirements before passing the state house.

He has also introduced the Colorado Payday Lending Reform Act, which would cap interest rates for payday lending at 36 percent and prohibit additional lending to borrowers already in debt, making Colorado's short-term lending regulation the strictest in the nation. The bill narrowly passed the state house on a vote of 33–30, and passed the state senate on 19–16 after being significantly amended. Ferrandino objected to senate amendments, claiming that they weakened the bill by loosening caps on lending fees. Several weeks later, Ferrandino and Senate cosponsor Peter Groff announced that they intended to kill the bill, but Ferrandino plans on re-introducing the bill during the 2009 session.

=== 2008 election ===
Ferrandino stood for election to a full term in 2008. In the Democratic Party primary, he faced former Eagle County commissioner James Johnson. Ferrandino easily won the Democratic nomination with over 81 percent of the vote, and faced Republican Thomas "Doc" Miller in the general election, winning handily. Ferrandino's re-election bid was endorsed by the Denver Post, and he easily won a full term in the legislature with 80 percent of the popular vote.

Ferrandino was also a member of the Democratic Party's platform committee for the 2008 Democratic National Convention, one of only three Colorado delegates to that committee.

=== 2009 legislative session ===
After winning re-election, Ferrandino was named to a post on the legislature's six-member Joint Budget Committee for the 2009 legislative session, and was tapped as vice-chair of the House Appropriations Committee. He remained on the Joint Budget Committee until his election as Democratic Leader in November 2011.

With Sen. Jennifer Veiga, Ferrandino introduced legislation to allow same-sex partners of state employees to receive health insurance benefits.

=== 2011 legislative session ===
In 2011, Ferrandino co-sponsored the Colorado Civil Unions Act, introducing it in the House. State Senator Pat Steadman originally introduced it in the Senate, where it passed with bipartisan support. The Colorado Civil Unions Act was an act to create legal recognition for same-sex and heterosexual couples in Colorado law. The act was killed in the Colorado House Judiciary Committee before it was able to reach a full House vote, where Ferrandino held it would have had the votes to pass.

See: Recognition of Same-Sex Unions in Colorado: The Colorado Civil Unions Act of 2011

In November 2011, House Democratic Leader Sal Pace announced that he would relinquish his leadership position to campaign for Congress in the 3rd district. Ferrandino ran to succeed him and was elected unopposed by the Democratic caucus on November 18, 2011.

=== 2012 election ===
In the 2012 General Election, Representative Ferrandino faced Republican challenger TJ Tyrrell. Ferrandino was reelected by a margin of 70% to 24%. As the longtime Minority Leader, Ferrandino was elected by his caucus as the Speaker of the House of the State of Colorado.

Colorado House of Representatives
Preceded by Mike May	Minority Leader of the Colorado House of Representatives; 2011–2013	Succeeded by Brian DelGrosso
Political offices
Preceded by Frank McNulty	Speaker of the Colorado House of Representatives; 2013–2015	Succeeded by Dickey Lee Hullinghorst
