= Matthew Ball (politician) =

American politician

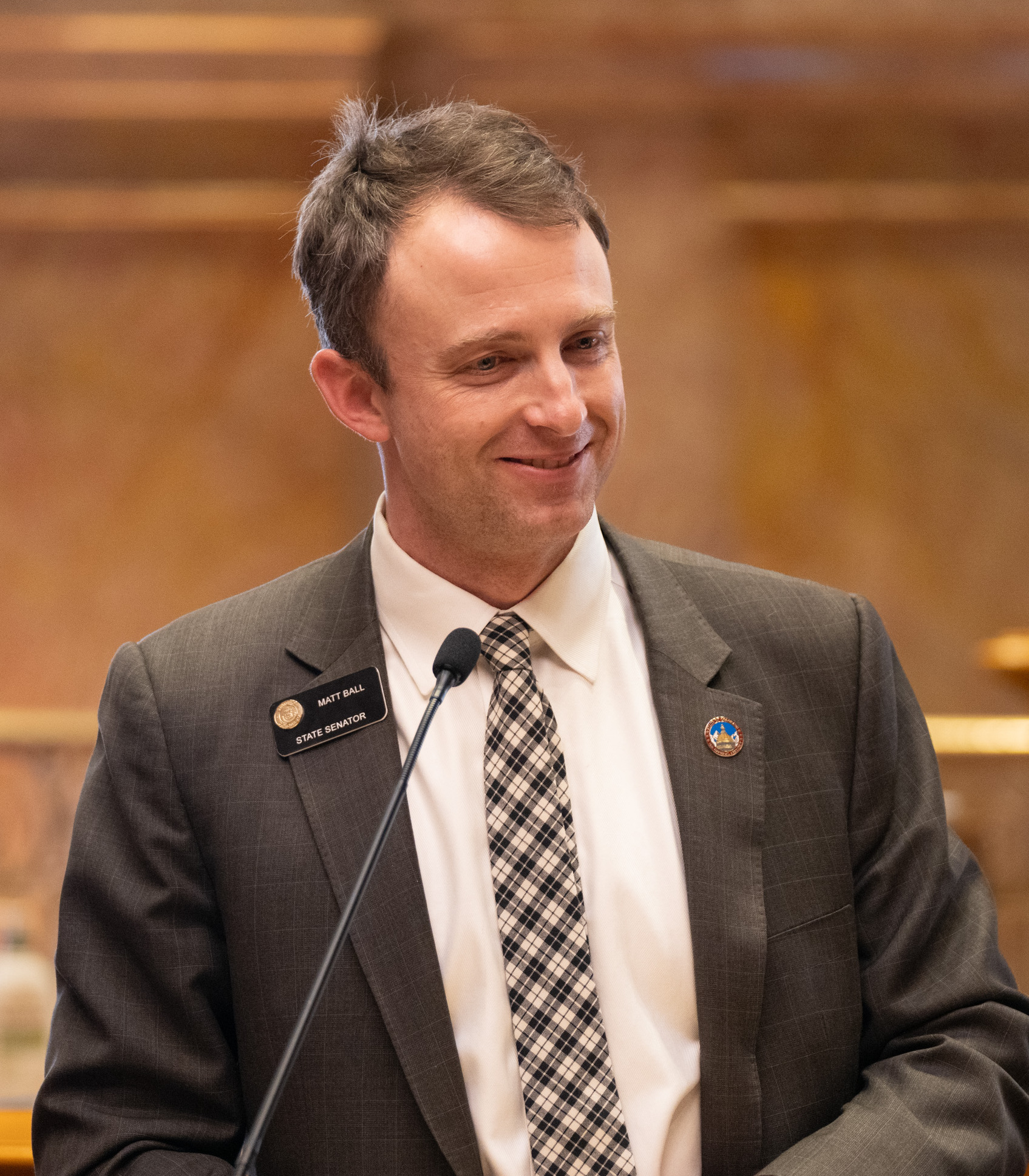

Member of the Colorado Senate from the 31st district
- Incumbent
- Assumed office January 9, 2025
- Preceded by: Chris Hansen

Personal details
- Party: Democratic
- Website: mattforcolorado.com

Matthew Ball is an American politician who is a member of the Colorado State Senate, representing the 31st district since 2025.

Ball is a fifth generation Coloradan. After college, Ball joined the United State Army and served in the 101st Airborne Division and 75th Ranger Regiment. Ball deployed three times to Afghanistan and once to Turkey with a Special Operations Task Force,earning two Bronze Stars. Ball continues to serve as a Reservist in the United States Army.

After leaving duty, Ball received a J.D. from Stanford Law School. In 2018, while attending Stanford, Ball successfully organized a campaign to bring his interpreter from Afghanistan to California. Ball was later named an Up & Coming Lawyer by Law Week Colorado in 2023 before serving as Policy Director for the City of Denver.

Ball was elected by a vacancy committee in January 2025 following the resignation of Chris Hansen, who had been re-elected two months earlier. Ball Currently serves as the Vice Chair of the Transportation and Energy Committee and on the Local Government and Housing Committee.

Ball is the son of former Olympian Richard Ball.
