= Bill Harmsen =

Candymaker

- Born: June 24, 1912; Saint Paul, Minnesota, US
- Died: April 10, 2002 (aged 89); Wheat Ridge, Colorado, US
- Spouse: Dorothy Harmsen
- Children: 3

Bill Harmsen (June 20, 1912, in Saint Paul, Minnesota – April 10, 2002 in Wheat Ridge, Colorado) was one of the creators of the Jolly Rancher brand of hard candies.

== Family ==
His wife Dorothy Harmsen was born on September 3, 1914, in Minneapolis, Minnesota, and died on August 29, 2006, of a heart attack at age 91. They had three children.

== Jolly Rancher ==
The couple moved to Denver, Colorado, in 1942. In 1949 they opened a candy store in Golden, Colorado, called the Jolly Rancher, named after the Jolly Farmer, a depression era general store selling hard candies in their hometown of Minneapolis. Unhappy with local candy suppliers, they decided to make their own candy, which led to the creation of Jolly Rancher candy. The Harmsens ran a very successful company for almost 21 years before selling it to Beatrice Foods in 1966, with Bill Harmsen residing as president until 1977. The company was purchased by Hershey in 1996, and Jolly Rancher has become one of America's most popular hard candies with over a dozen flavors and millions sold since their creation.

== Life After the Jolly Rancher ==
After his leaving the business, the Harmsens became even more involved in collecting Western Art and writing about it with their own publishing company. Some of the pieces in their collection included works by artists such as Alfred Miller, George Catlin, Joseph H. Sharp, Victor Higgins, Frederic Remington, and Robert Henri. Later in life, they donated tracts of land to the Golden Gate Canyon State Park in Colorado. In 2001, the couple donated close to 5,000 pieces of art and American West memorabilia to the Denver Art Museum.

He died of prostate cancer in 2002, aged 89.
