= Colorado's 31st Senate district =

American legislative district

Colorado's 31st State Senate district
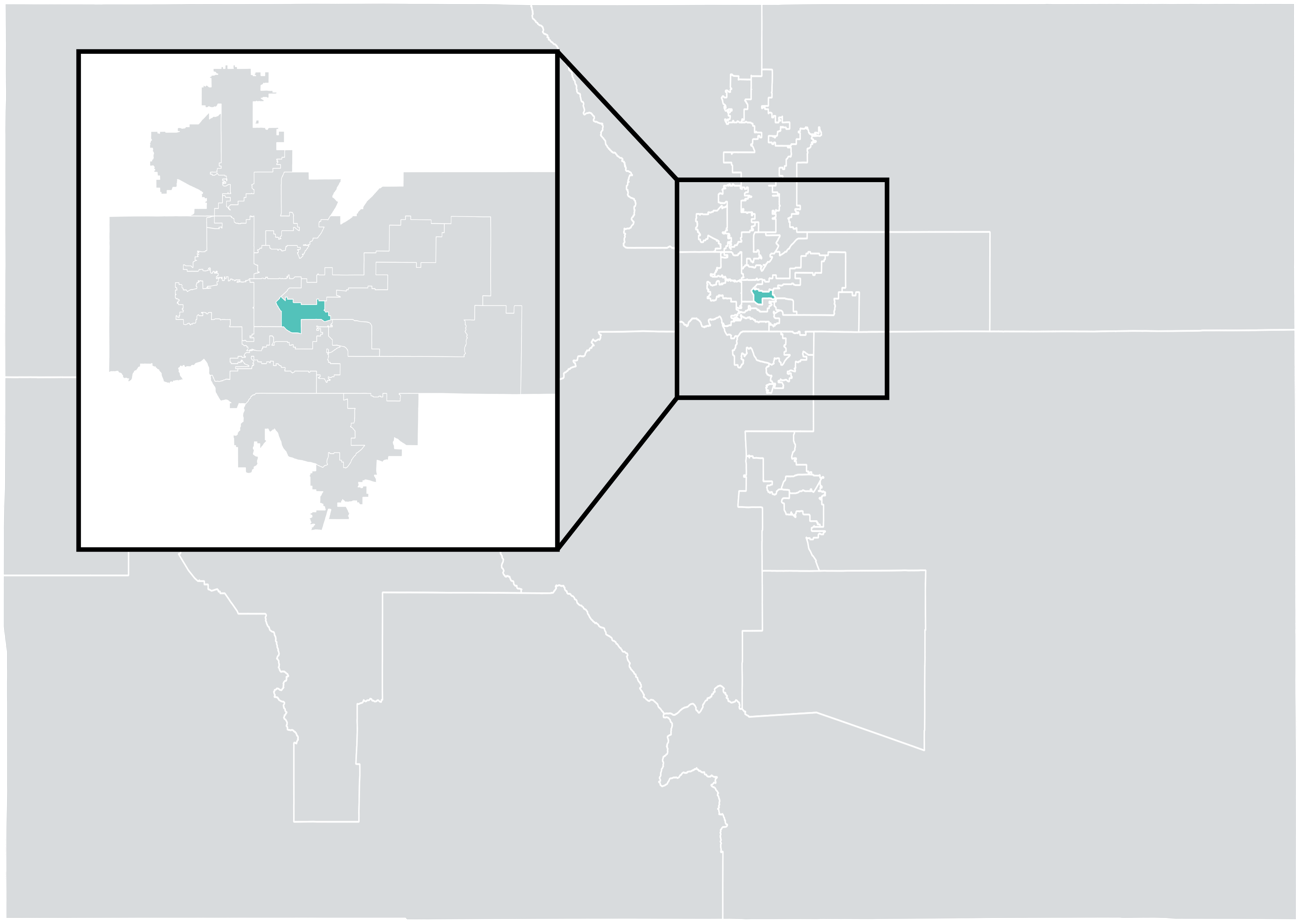
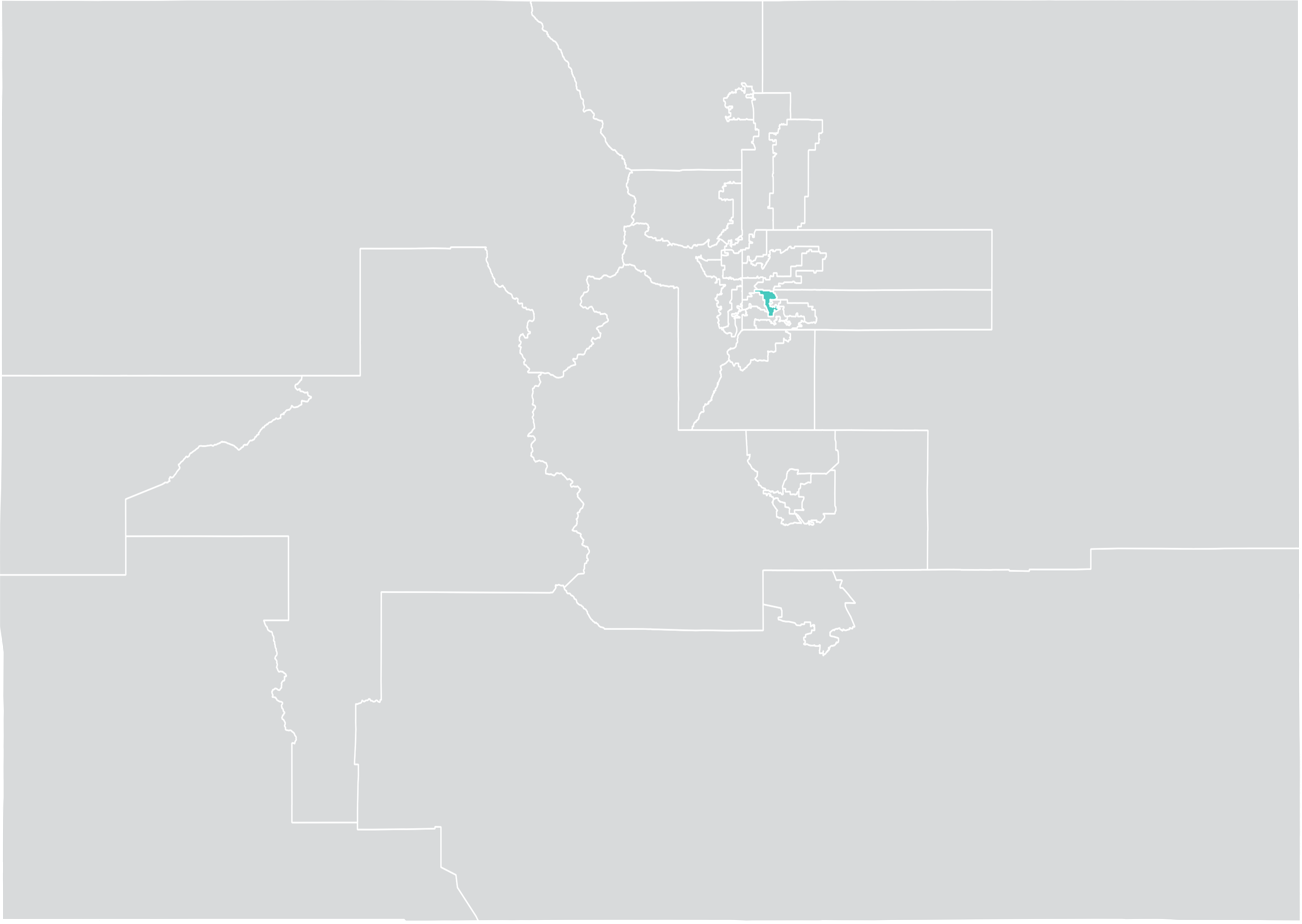
Senator
Matthew Ball; D–Denver
- Registration: 42.2% Democratic; 8.5% Republican; 47.0% No party preference
- Demographics: 70% White; 9% Black; 14% Hispanic; 4% Asian; 3% Other
- Population (2018): 167,225
- Registered voters: 126,790

Colorado's 31st Senate district is one of 35 districts in the Colorado Senate. It has been represented by Democrat Matthew Ball since 2025, following the resignation of fellow Democrat Chris Hansen.

== Geography ==
District 31 is based in the central and southeastern neighborhoods of Denver, including Capitol Hill; the district also includes the Arapahoe County exclaves of Glendale and Holly Hills.

The district is located entirely within Colorado's 1st congressional district, and overlaps with the 2nd, 5th, 6th, 8th, and 9th districts of the Colorado House of Representatives. At 23 square miles, it is the smallest Senate district in the state.

== Recent election results ==
Colorado state senators are elected to staggered four-year terms; under normal circumstances, the 31st district holds elections in presidential years.

=== 2020 ===
2020 Colorado State Senate election, District 31
Primary election
Party	Candidate	Votes	%
Democratic	Chris Hansen (incumbent)	24,439	52.7
Democratic	Maria Orms	21,916	47.3
Total votes		46,355	100
General election
Democratic	Chris Hansen (incumbent)	74,288	76.7
Republican	Doug Townsend	22,562	23.3
Total votes		96,850	100
Democratic hold			

=== 2016 ===
2016 Colorado State Senate election, District 31
Primary election
Party	Candidate	Votes	%
Democratic	Lois Court	7,632	44.1
Democratic	Steve Sherick	5,810	33.6
Democratic	Erin Bennett	3,874	22.4
Total votes		17,316	100
Republican	Bob Lane	3,189	67.9
Republican	Jeffery Washington	1,511	32.1
Total votes		4,700	100
General election
Democratic	Lois Court	57,793	69.6
Republican	Bob Lane	25,268	30.4
Total votes		83,061	100
Democratic hold			

=== 2012 ===
2012 Colorado State Senate election, District 31
Party	Candidate	Votes	%
Democratic	Pat Steadman (incumbent)	54,390	69.9
Republican	Michael Carr	23,425	30.1
Total votes		77,815	100
Democratic hold			

=== Federal and statewide results ===
Year	Office	Results
2020	President	Biden 78.2 – 19.4%
2018	Governor	Polis 75.8 – 21.4%
2016	President	Clinton 71.5 – 21.1%
2014	Senate	Udall 68.2 – 27.5%
2014	Governor	Hickenlooper 71.8 – 24.4%
2012	President	Obama 69.8 – 28.0%
