= Wheat Ridge, Colorado =

City in Colorado, United States

- Home rule municipality
- City of Wheat Ridge
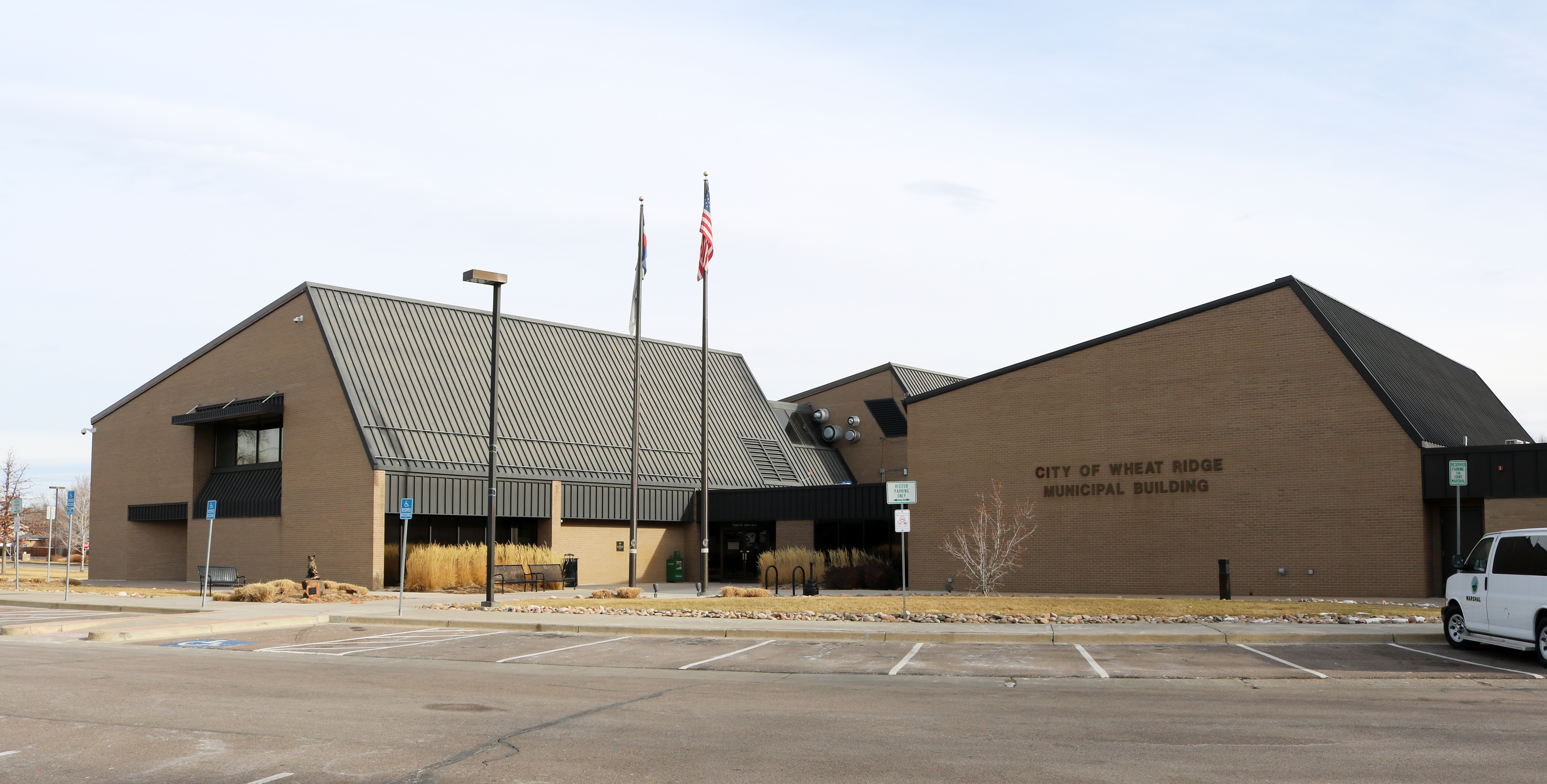
- Wheat Ridge Municipal Building

- Flag Seal Logo

- Location of the City of Wheat Ridge in Jefferson County, Colorado
- Coordinates: 39°46′23″N 105°07′13″W
- Country: United States
- State: Colorado
- County: Jefferson County
- City: Wheat Ridge
- Incorporated: June 17, 1969

Area
  - Total: 9.58 sq mi (24.8 km^{2})
  - Land: 9.34 sq mi (24.2 km^{2})
  - Water: 0.24 sq mi (0.62 km^{2})
- Elevation: 5,348 ft (1,630 m)

Population (2020)
  - Total: 32,398
  - Density: 3,470/sq mi (1,340/km^{2})
- Time zone: UTC−7 (MST)
  - Summer (DST): UTC−6 (MDT)
- ZIP codes: 80212, 80214, 80215, 80033, 80034
- Area codes: 303, 720
- FIPS code: 08-84440
- GNIS feature ID: 202840
- Website: www.ci.wheatridge.co.us

The City of Wheat Ridge is a home rule municipality in Jefferson County, Colorado, United States. Wheat Ridge is located immediately west of Denver and is a part of the Denver–Aurora–Lakewood, CO Metropolitan Statistical Area. The Wheat Ridge Municipal Center is approximately 8.5 miles (14 km) west-northwest of the Colorado State Capitol in Denver. The city had a population of 32,007, as of 2026 according to World Population Review.

== History ==
Wheat Ridge grew from a popular rest stop for travelers during the Gold Rush of the late 1850s to become an agricultural and suburban community known as the “Carnation City” in the mid-1900s. As the residential areas of unincorporated Jefferson County grew during the 1950s to provide housing to the Denver workforce, the major transportation corridors extending from Denver developed with commercial services. During that era, the formation of numerous utility and fire protection districts provided these unincorporated areas with urban services. Eventually, due to the increasing annexation pressure from nearby municipalities, Wheat Ridge incorporated in 1969.

== Geography ==
Wheat Ridge is located at the junction of Interstate 70 and Colorado State Highway 391 in central Colorado. It is immediately west of Denver and about 77 miles (124 km) north-northwest of Colorado Springs.

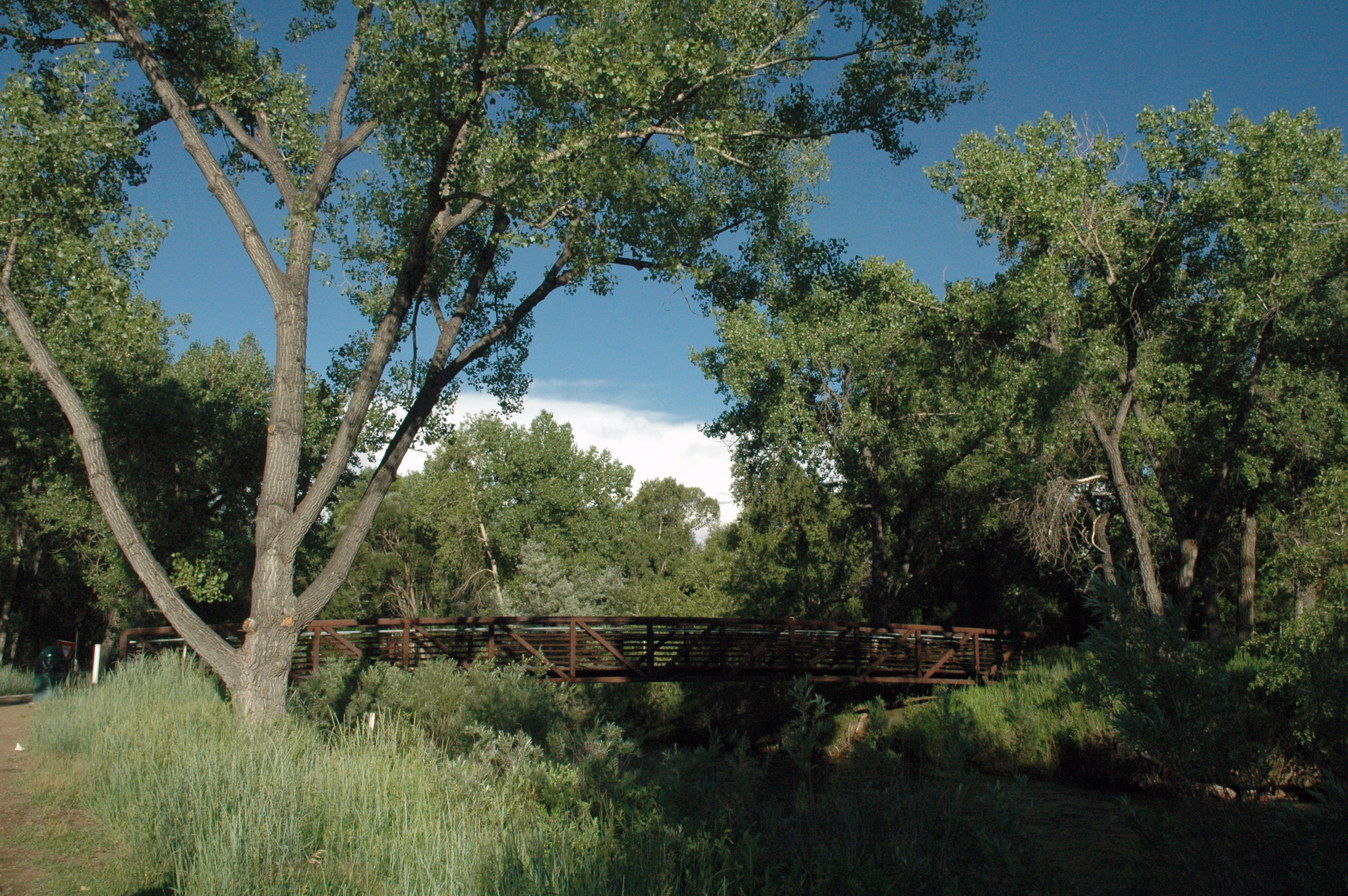
Clear Creek flows through a green zone with lakes, trails and parks.

Wheat Ridge is located in the Colorado Piedmont on the western edge of the Great Plains just east of the Front Range of the Southern Rocky Mountains. Clear Creek, a tributary of the South Platte River, flows east then northeast through the city. Lena Gulch, a tributary of Clear Creek, flows northeast through the southwest part of the city.

There are several small lakes and reservoirs in Wheat Ridge. Crown Hill Lake, Kestrel Pond, and North Henry Lee Reservoir are in the south-central part of the city. West Lake, Tabor Lake, and Prospect Lake are located along Clear Creek in the west-central part of the city.

According to the United States Census Bureau, the city has a total area of 9.55 square miles (24.7 km^{2}) of which 9.30 square miles (24.1 km^{2}) is land and 0.25 square miles (0.65 km^{2}) of it (2.6%) is water.

As a suburb of Denver, Wheat Ridge is part of both the greater Denver metropolitan area and the Front Range Urban Corridor. It borders other communities on all sides including: Arvada to the north; Lakeside, Mountain View, and Denver to the east; Edgewater to the southeast; Lakewood to the south; Applewood, and Golden to the southwest; and Fairmount to the northwest.

=== Climate ===
The climate is described as Humid Continental by the Köppen Climate System, abbreviated as Dfb.

Climate data for Wheat Ridge, Colorado, 1991–2020 normals, extremes 1981–present
Month	Jan	Feb	Mar	Apr	May	Jun	Jul	Aug	Sep	Oct	Nov	Dec	Year
Record high °F (°C)	78 (26)	79 (26)	89 (32)	92 (33)	97 (36)	103 (39)	104 (40)	105 (41)	100 (38)	94 (34)	84 (29)	77 (25)	105 (41)
Mean maximum °F (°C)	68.8 (20.4)	69.3 (20.7)	76.4 (24.7)	81.5 (27.5)	88.4 (31.3)	95.6 (35.3)	98.3 (36.8)	95.8 (35.4)	92.7 (33.7)	85.2 (29.6)	75.0 (23.9)	68.1 (20.1)	98.6 (37.0)
Mean daily maximum °F (°C)	47.2 (8.4)	48.3 (9.1)	56.6 (13.7)	61.9 (16.6)	70.9 (21.6)	82.5 (28.1)	88.2 (31.2)	86.3 (30.2)	79.0 (26.1)	66.0 (18.9)	54.8 (12.7)	46.6 (8.1)	65.7 (18.7)
Daily mean °F (°C)	32.2 (0.1)	33.3 (0.7)	41.2 (5.1)	47.5 (8.6)	56.7 (13.7)	66.8 (19.3)	72.5 (22.5)	70.4 (21.3)	62.1 (16.7)	49.8 (9.9)	39.4 (4.1)	31.6 (−0.2)	50.3 (10.2)
Mean daily minimum °F (°C)	17.1 (−8.3)	18.3 (−7.6)	25.9 (−3.4)	33.0 (0.6)	42.5 (5.8)	51.1 (10.6)	56.8 (13.8)	54.5 (12.5)	45.2 (7.3)	33.6 (0.9)	23.9 (−4.5)	16.7 (−8.5)	34.9 (1.6)
Mean minimum °F (°C)	−1.0 (−18.3)	1.4 (−17.0)	10.4 (−12.0)	19.5 (−6.9)	29.4 (−1.4)	40.9 (4.9)	50.0 (10.0)	46.7 (8.2)	33.5 (0.8)	19.0 (−7.2)	7.8 (−13.4)	−1.1 (−18.4)	−6.7 (−21.5)
Record low °F (°C)	−21 (−29)	−23 (−31)	−8 (−22)	4 (−16)	19 (−7)	33 (1)	40 (4)	37 (3)	14 (−10)	2 (−17)	−8 (−22)	−24 (−31)	−24 (−31)
Average precipitation inches (mm)	0.64 (16)	0.78 (20)	1.48 (38)	2.31 (59)	2.65 (67)	1.67 (42)	1.88 (48)	1.60 (41)	1.34 (34)	1.22 (31)	0.92 (23)	0.62 (16)	17.11 (435)
Average snowfall inches (cm)	9.6 (24)	11.9 (30)	12.9 (33)	12.1 (31)	2.2 (5.6)	0.0 (0.0)	0.0 (0.0)	0.0 (0.0)	1.0 (2.5)	5.9 (15)	10.0 (25)	9.9 (25)	75.5 (191.1)
Average extreme snow depth inches (cm)	4.8 (12)	5.5 (14)	5.8 (15)	4.3 (11)	1.2 (3.0)	0.0 (0.0)	0.0 (0.0)	0.0 (0.0)	0.4 (1.0)	3.3 (8.4)	5.1 (13)	5.7 (14)	11.6 (29)
Average precipitation days (≥ 0.01 in)	5.1	6.0	7.1	9.1	10.3	8.3	8.8	8.3	6.9	6.0	5.9	4.9	86.7
Average snowy days (≥ 0.1 in)	5.7	6.3	5.9	5.0	1.4	0.0	0.0	0.0	0.4	2.2	5.0	5.7	37.6
Source 1: NOAA
Source 2: National Weather Service

== Demographics ==
Historical population
Census	Pop.	Note	%±
1960	21,619		—
1970	29,778		37.7%
1980	30,293		1.7%
1990	29,419		−2.9%
2000	32,913		11.9%
2010	30,166		−8.3%
2020	32,398		7.4%
2024 (est.)	31,999	▼	−1.2%
U.S. Decennial Census

=== 2020 census ===
As of the 2020 census, Wheat Ridge had a population of 32,398. The median age was 41.1 years. 16.9% of residents were under the age of 18 and 20.6% of residents were 65 years of age or older. For every 100 females there were 95.2 males, and for every 100 females age 18 and over there were 93.3 males age 18 and over.

100.0% of residents lived in urban areas, while 0.0% lived in rural areas.

There were 14,663 households in Wheat Ridge, of which 22.2% had children under the age of 18 living in them. Of all households, 36.6% were married-couple households, 23.0% were households with a male householder and no spouse or partner present, and 31.4% were households with a female householder and no spouse or partner present. About 35.5% of all households were made up of individuals and 15.5% had someone living alone who was 65 years of age or older.

There were 15,471 housing units, of which 5.2% were vacant. The homeowner vacancy rate was 1.3% and the rental vacancy rate was 5.0%.

Racial composition as of the 2020 census
Race	Number	Percent
White	24,132	74.5%
Black or African American	466	1.4%
American Indian and Alaska Native	506	1.6%
Asian	695	2.1%
Native Hawaiian and Other Pacific Islander	44	0.1%
Some other race	2,410	7.4%
Two or more races	4,145	12.8%
Hispanic or Latino (of any race)	7,231	22.3%

=== 2010 census ===
As of the 2010 census, there were 30,166 people, 13,976 households, and 7,489 families residing in the city. The population density was 3,243.7 inhabitants per square mile (1,252.4/km^{2}). There were 14,868 housing units at an average density of 1,598.7 per square mile (617.3/km^{2}). The racial makeup of the city was 85.6% White, 1.6% Asian, 1.2% African American, 1.2% American Indian, 0.1% Pacific Islander, 6.9% from other races, and 3.4% from two or more races. Hispanics and Latinos of any race were 20.9% of the population.

There were 13,976 households, of which 23.1% had children under the age of 18, 36.5% were married couples living together, 5.4% had a male householder with no wife present, 11.6% had a female householder with no husband present, and 46.4% were non-families. 38.4% of households were made up of individuals, and 14.7% had someone living alone who was 65 years of age or older. The average household size was 2.12, and the average family size was 2.81.

The distribution of the population by age was 18.7% under the age of 18, 7.3% from 18 to 24, 25.7% from 25 to 44, 29.7% from 45 to 64, and 18.6% who were 65 years of age or older. The median age was 43.7 years. The gender makeup of the city was 48.6% male and 51.4% female.

The median household income in the city was $47,014, and the median family income was $59,275. Males had a median income of $45,655 versus $36,741 for females. The city's per capita income was $28,372. About 8.7% of families and 10.9% of the population were below the poverty line, including 16.7% of those under age 18 and 6.3% of those age 65 or over.

== Economy ==
As of 2013, 65.2% of the population over the age of 16 was in the labor force. 0.2% was in the armed forces, and 65.0% was in the civilian labor force with 58.7% employed and 6.3% unemployed. The occupational composition of the employed civilian labor force was 37.3% in management, business, science, and arts; 26.2% in sales and office occupations; 18.5% in service occupations; 10.6% in production, transportation, and material moving; and 7.4% in natural resources, construction, and maintenance. The three industries employing the largest percentages of the working civilian labor force were educational services, health care, and social assistance (21.4%); professional, scientific, and management, and administrative and waste management services (12.3%); and retail trade (12.1%).

The cost of living in Wheat Ridge is above average; compared to a U.S. average of 100, the cost of living index for the community is 108.5. As of 2013, the median home value in the city was $237,500, the median selected monthly owner cost was $1,556 for housing units with a mortgage and $406 for those without, and the median gross rent was $820.

=== Agriculture ===
Until the 1960s, the city's identity was primarily defined by mid- to large-scale agricultural production. Orchards and crop fields were the predominant use with pockets of homes and businesses located amongst the agrarian landscape. Glimpses into the city's agricultural past can still be found, however Wheat Ridge has experienced substantial population growth and development over the last 40 years and is largely built out with a combination of residential, commercial, and office uses.

Recent zoning changes have allowed urban agriculture a resurgence in all parts of the city. City regulations allow homeowners to engage in a range of urban agricultural activities, including growing and selling produce and keeping animals such as bees and chickens. City Council adopted Ordinance 1491 in May 2011 which supports urban agriculture in Wheat Ridge. This ordinance updated the city's regulations so that community gardens (under the category of “urban gardens”), farmers’ markets, and produce stands are now allowed in any zone district.

A summary of the three uses permitted in each zone district may be found below.

- Urban Gardens – an urban garden is defined as an area of land formally managed, organized, and maintained by an individual or group of individuals to grow and harvest food crops or non-food ornamental crops, such as flowers. Common examples of urban gardens include: • Community gardens, where plots of land are leased for a minimal cost and crops are usually consumed or donated • Market gardens, where crops are sold for profit • Community supported agriculture (CSA), where crops are sold or donated for shareholder consumption Urban gardens are allowed in all zone districts, including residential.
- Farmers’ Markets – farmers' markets are allowed in any zone district, except in residential zone districts on properties where the primary use is a single- or two-family home. Farmers’ markets require a business license, which you may apply for through the city's Sales Tax Division.
- Produce Stands - a produce stand is a temporary structure where agricultural products such as raw vegetables, fruits, herbs, flowers, plants, nuts, honey, and eggs are sold. Value-added agricultural products which are made from raw agricultural products such as jams and jellies may also be sold from produce stands. Produce stands require a business license, which you may apply for through the city's Sales Tax Division. Produce stands on residential properties must also follow the rules for home occupations.

== Community development ==
=== Wheat Ridge Envision Wheat Ridge Comprehensive Plan ===
Following direction from the City Council, the City embarked on a Comprehensive Plan Update that began in the fall of 2008. The City hired a consultant, Clarion Associates, with the expertise in comprehensive plan development to assist the City in updating the plan. In addition, the City formed a Citizens Advisory Committee to provide advice and feedback to the Planning Commission and City Council on the development of the Plan. On October 12, 2009, City Council approved a resolution, Resolution 52–2009, adopting the Envision Wheat Ridge Comprehensive Plan.

== Culture ==
=== Points of interest ===
Wheat Ridge is home to the James H. Baugh House, which is listed in the National Register of Historic Places and the Colorado State Register of Historic Properties. The Baugh House is an 1860 hand-hewn log cabin encased in a circa 1904 frame farmhouse, and one of several historic structures in the Wheat Ridge Historic Park. The Wheat Ridge Historical Society, in cooperation with the Colorado Historical Society and the City of Wheat Ridge, restored the house, which was designated on August 14, 2012.

Wheat Ridge hosts the Carnation Festival in the beginning of August each year. The festival is held at Anderson Park by a nonprofit group, where most funds raised go back towards the community. The festival is held in remembrance of the carnation industry post World War II. The festival is free and family friendly, hosting attractions such as rides, food, drinks, and games.

== Notable people ==
Notable individuals who were born in or have lived in Wheat Ridge include actor and singer Dean Reed, Jolly Rancher founders Bill and Dorothy Harmsen, NASA astronaut Matthew Dominick, and U.S. Olympic cyclist Linda Brenneman.

== See also ==
- List of municipalities in Colorado
