= 2021 Texas Longhorns football team =

American college football season

2021 Texas Longhorns football
- Conference: Big 12 Conference
- Record: 5–7 (3–6 Big 12)
- Head coach: Steve Sarkisian (1st season)
- Offensive coordinator: Kyle Flood (1st season)
- Offensive scheme: Multiple
- Defensive coordinator: Pete Kwiatkowski (1st season)
- Co-defensive coordinator: Jeff Choate (1st season)
- Base defense: 4–2–5
- Home stadium: Darrell K Royal–Texas Memorial Stadium

Uniform
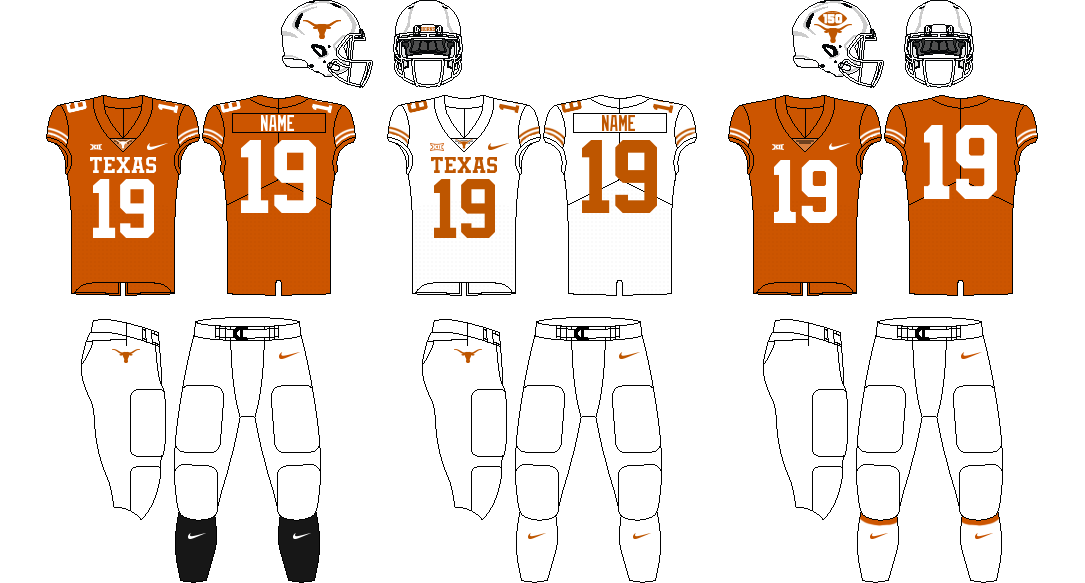

2021 Big 12 Conference football standings
	Conf.			Overall
Team	W		L	W		L
No. 7 Oklahoma State y	8	–	1	12	–	2
No. 5 Baylor y$	7	–	2	12	–	2
No. 10 Oklahoma	7	–	2	11	–	2
Iowa State	5	–	4	7	–	6
Kansas State	4	–	5	8	–	5
West Virginia	4	–	5	6	–	7
Texas	3	–	6	5	–	7
TCU	3	–	6	5	–	7
Texas Tech	3	–	6	7	–	6
Kansas	1	–	8	2	–	10
Championship: Baylor 21, Oklahoma State 16
$ – Conference champion; y – Championship game participant; Rankings from AP Poll

The 2021 Texas Longhorns football team represented the University of Texas at Austin during the 2021 NCAA Division I FBS football season. The Longhorns played their home games at Darrell K Royal–Texas Memorial Stadium in Austin, Texas. They are a charter member of the Big 12 Conference. They were led by first-year head coach Steve Sarkisian.

== Schedule ==
Date	Time	Opponent	Rank	Site	TV	Result	Attendance
September 4	3:30 p.m.	No. 23 Louisiana*	No. 21	Darrell K Royal–Texas Memorial Stadium; Austin, TX	FOX	W 38–18	91,113
September 11	6:00 p.m.	at Arkansas*	No. 15	D.W.R. Razorback Stadium; Fayetteville, AR (rivalry / SEC Nation)	ESPN	L 21–40	74,531
September 18	7:00 p.m.	Rice*^{†}		Darrell K Royal–Texas Memorial Stadium; Austin, TX (rivalry)	LHN	W 58–0	91,978
September 25	11:00 a.m.	Texas Tech		Darrell K Royal–Texas Memorial Stadium; Austin, TX (rivalry)	ABC	W 70–35	98,349
October 2	11:00 a.m.	at TCU		Amon G. Carter Stadium; Fort Worth, TX (rivalry)	ABC	W 32–27	43,337
October 9	11:00 a.m.	vs. No. 6 Oklahoma	No. 21	Cotton Bowl; Dallas, TX (Red River Showdown / ESPN College GameDay)	ABC	L 48–55	92,100
October 16	11:00 a.m.	No. 12 Oklahoma State	No. 25	Darrell K Royal–Texas Memorial Stadium; Austin, TX	FOX	L 24–32	99,916
October 30	11:00 a.m.	at No. 16 Baylor		McLane Stadium; Waco, TX (rivalry)	ABC	L 24–31	45,834
November 6	6:30 p.m.	at Iowa State		Jack Trice Stadium; Ames, IA	FS1	L 7–30	61,500
November 13	6:30 p.m.	Kansas		Darrell K Royal–Texas Memorial Stadium; Austin, TX	ESPNU	L 56–57 ^{OT}	95,202
November 20	11:00 a.m.	at West Virginia		Mountaineer Field; Morgantown, WV	ESPN2	L 23–31	48,755
November 26	11:00 a.m.	Kansas State		Darrell K Royal–Texas Memorial Stadium; Austin, TX	FOX	W 22–17	75,072
*Non-conference game; ^{†}Homecoming; Rankings from AP Poll and CFP Rankings; All times are in Central time; Source: Texas Sports

== Offseason ==
=== Position key ===
Back	B	Center	C	Cornerback	CB	Defensive back	DB		
Defensive end	DE	Defensive lineman	DL	Defensive tackle	DT	End	E		
Fullback	FB	Place Kicker	PK	Guard	G	Halfback	HB	Kicker	K
Kickoff returner	KR	Offensive tackle	OT	Offensive lineman	OL	Linebacker	LB		
Long snapper	LS	Split end	SE	Punter	P	Punt returner	PR	Quarterback	QB
Running back	RB	Safety	S	Tight end	TE	Wide receiver	WR		

=== Players ===
2021 Texas offseason departures
Name	Number	Pos.	Height	Weight	Year	Hometown	Notes
Sam Cosmi	52	OT	6’7	309	Junior	Humble, TX	Declared for NFL Draft
Caden Sterns	7	DB	6’1	207	Junior	Cibolo, TX	Declared for NFL Draft
Joseph Ossai	46	LB	6’4	253	Junior	Conroe, TX	Declared for NFL Draft
Brennan Eagles	13	WR	6'4	229	Junior	Houston, TX	Declared for NFL Draft
Sam Ehlinger	11	QB	6’3	225	Senior	Austin, TX	Graduated
Chris Brown	15	DB	5’11	187	Senior	Houston, TX	Graduated
Tarik Black	0	WR	6'3	217	Senior	Hamden, CT	Graduated
Jack Geiger	40	P	5’11	205	Senior	San Jose, CA	Graduated
Ta'Quon Graham	49	DE	6’4	294	Senior	Temple, TX	Graduated
John Lily	90	DL	6’1	262	Senior	Houston, TX	Graduated
Tristan Bennett	96	DL	6'3	235	Senior	Irving, TX	Graduated
Cort Jaquess	57	LB	6'1	239	Senior	San Antonio, TX	Graduated

==== Transfers ====
Outgoing

Name	No.	Pos.	Height	Weight	Hometown	Year	New school
Keaontay Ingram	#26	RB	6’0	235	Carthage, TX	Junior	USC
Jalen Green	#3	DB	6’1	197	Houston, TX	Junior	Mississippi State
Ja'Quinden Jackson	#3	QB	6’2	232	Dallas, TX	Freshman	Utah
Daniel Carson	#88	DL	6'4	276	Kansas City, MO	Sophomore	Western Illinois
Xavion Alford	#4	DB	6'0	190	Pearland, TX	Freshman	USC
Kenyetta Watson	#2	CB	6’1	190	Loganville, GA	Redshirt Freshman	Georgia Tech
Byron Vaughns	#50	LB	6’3	216	Fort Worth, TX	Redshirt Junior	Utah State
Willie Tyler	#55	OL	6'7	335	Racine, WI	Redshirt Sophomore	Syracuse
Marqez Bimage	#42	DL	6'2	251	Brenham, TX	Senior	California
Juwan Mitchell	#6	ILB	6'1	235	Middletown, NJ	Senior	Tennessee
Malcolm Epps	#19	TE	6'5	218	Houston, TX	Junior	USC
Reese Moore	#76	OL	6'7	304	Seminole, TX	Junior	Abilene Christian
Jake Smith	#7	WR	6'0	195	Scottsdale, AZ	Junior	USC

Incoming

Name	No.	Pos.	Height	Weight	Hometown	Year	Prev school
Ben Davis	#6	LB	6’4	243	Gordo, AL	Senior	Alabama
Devin Richardson	#30	LB	6’3	215	Spring, TX	Junior	New Mexico State
Ovie Oghoufo	#18	LB	6’3	215	Farmington, MI	Junior	Notre Dame
Ray Thornton	#46	LB	6’3	225	Killeen, TX	Senior	LSU
Darion Dunn	#4	CB	6’1	192	Oakdale, LA	Senior	McNeese State
Keilan Robinson	#7	RB	5’9	190	Washington D.C.	Sophomore	Alabama
Gabriel Lozano	#96	K	6’0	172	Austin, TX	Sophomore	Texas Tech
Carlton Smith	#53	LB	6’3	237	Houston, TX	Senior	LSU

=== Coaching staff departures ===
Name	Position	New Team	New Position
Tom Herman	Head Coach	Chicago Bears	Offensive Analyst/Special Projects
Chris Ash	Defensive coordinator	Jacksonville Jaguars	Defensive Backs
Mike Yurcich	Offensive coordinator	Penn State	Offensive coordinator
Jay Valai	Cornerbacks coach	Alabama	Cornerback coach
Oscar Giles	Defensive lines coach		
Coleman Hutzler	Co-defensive coordinator/linebackers coach	Ole Miss	Special teams coordinator
Herb Hand	Co-Offensive coordinator/offensive line coach	UCF	Offensive line coach
Jay Boulware	Assistant head coach/special teams/tight ends coach		
Bryan Carrington	Director of Recruiting	USC	Quality Control Analyst

=== 2021 Recruits ===
College recruiting
Name	Hometown	School	Height	Weight	Commit date
Ja'Tavion Sanders; ATH	Denton, TX	Billy Ryan High School	6 ft 3.5 in (1.92 m)	220 lb (100 kg)	Sep 8, 2019
Ja'Tavion Sanders; ATH	Recruit ratings: Rivals: 247Sports: ESPN: (90)				
JD Coffey; S	Kennedale, TX	Kennedale High School	6 ft 0.5 in (1.84 m)	180 lb (82 kg)	Jun 15, 2020
JD Coffey; S	Recruit ratings: Rivals: 247Sports: ESPN: (83)				
Jamier Johnson; CB	Pasadena, CA	John Muir High School	6 ft 0 in (1.83 m)	170 lb (77 kg)	Jul 3, 2020
Jamier Johnson; CB	Recruit ratings: Rivals: 247Sports: ESPN: (81)				
Derrick Harris Jr. OLB	New Caney, TX	New Caney High School	6 ft 2.5 in (1.89 m)	215 lb (98 kg)	Aug 3, 2019
Derrick Harris Jr. OLB	Recruit ratings: Rivals: 247Sports: ESPN: (83)				
Jordon Thomas; DE	Port Arthur, TX	Memorial High School (Port Arthur, Texas)	6 ft 3 in (1.91 m)	240 lb (110 kg)	May 2, 2020
Jordon Thomas; DE	Recruit ratings: Rivals: 247Sports: ESPN: (83)				
Terrence Cooks; OLB	Pearland, TX	Shadow Creek High School	6 ft 2 in (1.88 m)	210 lb (95 kg)	Nov 14, 2020
Terrence Cooks; OLB	Recruit ratings: Rivals: 247Sports: ESPN: (83)				
Morice Blackwell; OLB	Arlington, TX	Martin High School (Arlington, Texas)	6 ft 1 in (1.85 m)	196 lb (89 kg)	May 10, 2020
Morice Blackwell; OLB	Recruit ratings: Rivals: 247Sports: ESPN: (81)				
Jaden Alexis; WR	Pompano Beach, FL	Monarch High School (Florida)	5 ft 11 in (1.80 m)	185 lb (84 kg)	Aug 8, 2020
Jaden Alexis; WR	Recruit ratings: Rivals: 247Sports: ESPN: (80)				
Hayden Conner; OT	Katy, TX	Taylor High School	6 ft 5.5 in (1.97 m)	317 lb (144 kg)	Jul 23, 2019
Hayden Conner; OT	Recruit ratings: Rivals: 247Sports: ESPN: (82)				
Byron Murphy II; DT	DeSoto, TX	DeSoto High School	6 ft 1 in (1.85 m)	290 lb (130 kg)	Nov 18, 2020
Byron Murphy II; DT	Recruit ratings: Rivals: 247Sports: ESPN: (79)				
Jonathon Brooks; RB	Hallettsville, TX	Hallettsville High School	6 ft 0 in (1.83 m)	185 lb (84 kg)	May 15, 2020
Jonathon Brooks; RB	Recruit ratings: Rivals: 247Sports: ESPN: (78)				
Juan Davis; ATH	Fort Worth, TX	Everman High School	6 ft 4 in (1.93 m)	217 lb (98 kg)	Jul 26, 2019
Juan Davis; ATH	Recruit ratings: Rivals: 247Sports: ESPN: (78)				
Gunnar Helm; TE	Englewood, CO	Cherry Creek High School	6 ft 5 in (1.96 m)	225 lb (102 kg)	Jul 27, 2020
Gunnar Helm; TE	Recruit ratings: Rivals: 247Sports: ESPN: (76)				
Barryn Sorrell; DE	New Orleans, LA	Holy Cross School (New Orleans)	6 ft 3 in (1.91 m)	250 lb (110 kg)	Dec 16, 2020
Barryn Sorrell; DE	Recruit ratings: Rivals: 247Sports: ESPN: (76)				
Charles Wright; QB	Austin, TX	Austin High School	6 ft 1 in (1.85 m)	194 lb (88 kg)	Aug 22, 2020
Charles Wright; QB	Recruit ratings: Rivals: 247Sports: ESPN: (75)				
Casey Cain; WR	New Orleans, LA	Warren Easton High School	6 ft 2 in (1.88 m)	175 lb (79 kg)	May 15, 2020
Casey Cain; WR	Recruit ratings: Rivals: 247Sports: ESPN: (76)				
Max Merril; OT	Houston, TX	Strake Jesuit High School	6 ft 4 in (1.93 m)	273 lb (124 kg)	Sep 25, 2020
Max Merril; OT	Recruit ratings: Rivals: 247Sports: ESPN: (77)				
Isaac Pearson; P	Melbourne, Australia	Pro Kick Australia	6 ft 2 in (1.88 m)	215 lb (98 kg)	May 29, 2020
Isaac Pearson; P	Recruit ratings: Rivals: 247Sports: ESPN: (74)				
Ishmael Ibraheem; CB	Dallas, TX	Kimball High School	6 ft 1 in (1.85 m)	175 lb (79 kg)	Jun 15, 2020
Ishmael Ibraheem; CB	Recruit ratings: Rivals: 247Sports: ESPN: (84)				
Keithron Lee; WR	Bryan, TX	James Earl Rudder High School	5 ft 10 in (1.78 m)	175 lb (79 kg)	Dec 25, 2020
Keithron Lee; WR	Recruit ratings: Rivals: 247Sports: ESPN: (79)				
Cole Lourd; QB	Los Angeles, CA	Brentwood School	6 ft 2 in (1.88 m)	220 lb (100 kg)	Feb 4, 2021
Cole Lourd; QB	Recruit ratings: Rivals: 247Sports: ESPN: (73)				
David Abiara; DE	Mansfield, TX	Mansfield Legacy High School	6 ft 4 in (1.93 m)	248 lb (112 kg)	Feb 3, 2021
David Abiara; DE	Recruit ratings: Rivals: 247Sports: ESPN: (82)				
Xavier Worthy; WR	Fresno, CA	Central East High School	6 ft 1 in (1.85 m)	160 lb (73 kg)	Apr 25, 2021
Xavier Worthy; WR	Recruit ratings: Rivals: 247Sports: ESPN: (86)				
Overall recruit ranking: Rivals: 14 247Sports: 15 ESPN: 13
Note: In many cases, Scout, Rivals, 247Sports, On3, and ESPN may conflict in their listings of height and weight.; In these cases, the average was taken. ESPN grades are on a 100-point scale.; Sources: "Rivals commits". Rivals.; "ESPN commits". ESPN.; "2021 Team Ranking". Rivals.com.; "247Sports commits". 247Sports.

=== Spring game ===
The spring game was played on Saturday, April 24

Team	1	2	3	4	Total
Orange	6	3	3	0	12
• White	0	13	7	0	20

- Date: April, 24
- Location: Austin, TX
- Sources:Stats

Team	Category	Player	Statistics
Orange	Passing	Casey Thompson	23–42, 242 yards, 0 TDs
Orange	Rushing	Bijan Robinson	10 carries, 54 yards, 1 TDs
Orange	Receiving	Jordan Whittington	5 receptions, 56 yards, 0 TDs
White	Passing	Hudson Card	16–26, 191 yards, 1 TDs
White	Rushing	Roschon Johnson	7 carries, 28 yards, 0 TDs
White	Receiving	Kai Money	6 receptions, 79 yards, 0 TDs

=== 2021 NFL draft ===
Round	Pick	Player	Position	NFL team
# 2	51	Sam Cosmi	OT	Washington Football Team
# 3	69	Joseph Ossai	LB	Cincinnati Bengals
# 5	148	Ta'Quon Graham	DE	Atlanta Falcons
# 5	152	Caden Sterns	S	Denver Broncos
# 6	218	Sam Ehlinger	QB	Indianapolis Colts

=== Returning starters ===
Offense
Player	Class	Position
Junior Angilau	Junior	Offensive Line
Christian Jones	Junior	Offensive Line
Roschon Johnson	Junior	Running Back
Bijan Robinson	Sophomore	Running back
Joshua Moore	Junior	Wide Receiver

Defense
Player	Class	Position
Moro Ojomo	Junior	Defensive End
Keondre Coburn	Junior	Defensive Line
DeMarvion Overshown	Senior	Linebacker
D'Shawn Jamison	Senior	Cornerback
Josh Thompson	Senior	Cornerback
Chris Adimora	Junior	Safety

Special teams
Player	Class	Position
Cameron Dicker	Senior	Kicker
Ryan Bujcevski	Senior	Punter

== Preseason ==
=== Award watch lists ===
Listed in the order that they were released

Award	Player	Position	Year
Lott Trophy	Josh Thompson	DB	RS Sr.
Maxwell Award	Bijan Robinson	RB	So.
Bednarik Award	Keondre Coburn	DL	Jr.
Doak Walker Award	Bijan Robinson	RB	So.
Mackey Award	Cade Brewer	TE	Sr.
Butkus Award	DeMarvion Overshown	LB	Sr.
Lou Groza Award	Cameron Dicker	K	Sr.
Ray Guy Award	Ryan Bujcevski	P	Sr.
Hornung Award	D'Shawn Jamison	DB	Sr.
Walter Camp Award	Bijan Robinson	RB	So.
Patrick Mannelly Award	Justin Mader	LS	Sr.
Johnny Unitas Golden Arm Award	Casey Thompson	QB	Jr.
Biletnikoff Award	Xavier Worthy	WR	Fr.

=== Big 12 media poll ===
Big 12 media poll
Predicted finish	Team	Votes (1st place)
1	Oklahoma	386 (35)
2	Iowa State	351 (4)
3	Texas	273
4	Oklahoma State	266
5	TCU	255
6	West Virginia	185
7	Kansas State	163
8	Baylor	124
9	Texas Tech	103
10	Kansas	39

=== Preseason All-Big 12 teams ===
Offense

1st team

Bijan Robinson – RB (Coaches, Media)

Defense

1st team

D'Shawn Jamison – DB (Coaches, Media)

== Personnel ==
=== Coaching staff ===
Coach	Title	Year at Texas	Previous job
Steve Sarkisian	Head Coach	1st	Alabama (OC)
Jeff Banks	AHC/TE/ST	1st	Alabama (TE/ST)
Kyle Flood	OC/OL	1st	Alabama (OL)
A. J. Milwee	QB	1st	Alabama (offensive analyst)
Andre Coleman	WR	3rd	Kansas State (OC/WR)
Stan Drayton	AHC/RGC/RB	5th	Chicago Bears (RB)
Pete Kwiatkowski	DC/OLB	1st	Washington (DC/OLB)
Jeff Choate	Co-DC, ILB	1st	Montana State (HC)
Bo Davis	DL	1st	Detroit Lions (DL)
Terry Joseph	DB	1st	Notre Dame (DB)
Blake Gideon	S	1st	Ole Miss (ST)
Torre Becton	S&C	1st	California (S&C)

=== Roster ===
2021 Texas Longhorns football
Quarterback: 1 Hudson Card – (redshirt) freshman (6'2, 200); 11 Casey Thompson – junior (6'1, 200); 14 Charles Wright – freshman (6'1, 200); 16 Ben Ballard – sophomore (5'11, 196); 19 Cole Lourd – freshman (6’2, 228); Running back: 2 Roschon Johnson – junior (6'2, 219); 5 Bijan Robinson – sophomore (6’0, 214); 7 Keilan Robinson – sophomore (5’9, 183); 23 Jarrett Smith – junior (5'7, 206); 24 Jonathon Brooks – freshman (6'0, 199); 27 Skyler Bonneau – senior (6'1, 220); 31 Anton Simieou – (redshirt) freshman (5’11, 209); 32 Daniel Young – senior (6’0, 220); 33 Gabriel Watson – senior (6'2, 235); Wide receiver: 4 Jordan Whittington – sophomore (6'1, 203); 6 Joshua Moore – junior (6'1, 168); 8 Xavier Worthy – freshman (6'1, 160); 9 Al'Vonte Woodard – junior (6'2, 193); 13 Jaden Alexis – freshman (6’0, 188); 15 Marcus Washington – junior (6'2, 191); 16 Kelvontay Dixon – (redshirt) freshman (6'0, 179); 21 Troy Omeire – (redshirt) freshman (6'3, 220); 30 Dajon Harrison – (redshirt) freshman (5’10, 165); 39 Montrell Estell– senior (6’1, 196); 82 Kartik Akihal – junior (6'2, 192); 83 Kai Money – junior (6'0, 179); 84 Travis West – junior (6'0, 174); 86 Paxton Anderson – (redshirt) freshman (6'4, 215); 87 Parker Alford – sophomore (5’10, 180); 88 Casey Cain – freshman (6’3, 192); Tight end: 3 Ja'Tavion Sanders – freshman (6'4, 256); 18 Jared Wiley – junior (6'7, 251); 42 Nathan Hatter – sophomore (6'2, 233); 80 Cade Brewer – senior (6'4, 243); 81 Juan Davis – freshman (6'4, 226); 85 Gunnar Helm – freshman (6'5, 238); 89 Brayden Liebrock – sophomore (6'4, 228); Kicker/Punter: 8 Ryan Bujcevski – P – senior (6'0, 177); 17 Cameron Dicker – K – senior (6'1, 216); 38 Erwin Von Nacher - K – (redshirt) freshman (6'1, 167); 45 Bert Auburn - K – freshman (6'0, 172); 49 Isaac Pearson - P – freshman (6'2, 224); 96 Gabriel Lozano – K – sophomore (6'0, 172)	Offensive line: 57 Christian Rizzi – freshman (5’11, 215); 64 Michael Balis – sophomore (6'5, 287); 65 Jake Majors – (redshirt) freshman (6'3, 310); 66 Chad Wolf – sophomore (6'3, 270); 67 Tope Imade – senior (6'6, 361); 68 Derek Kerstetter – senior (6'5, 310); 69 Andrej Karic – (redshirt) freshman (6'4, 300); 70 Christian Jones – junior (6'6, 314); 71 Logan Parr – (redshirt) freshman (6'4, 308); 72 Tyler Johnson – sophomore (6'6, 325); 73 Isaiah Hookfin – sophomore (6'5, 299); 74 Rafiti Ghirmai – junior (6'5, 296); 75 Junior Angilau – junior (6'6, 319); 76 Hayden Conner – freshman (6'5, 332); 77 Jaylen Garth – (redshirt) freshman (6'5, 309); 78 Denzel Okafor – senior (6'4, 322); 79 Max Merril – freshman (6'4, 285); Defensive line: 3 Jacoby Jones - senior (6'4, 255); 32 Prince Dorbah – (redshirt) freshman (6'3, 234); 43 Chris Hannon – junior (6'2, 229); 45 Vernon Broughton – (redshirt) freshman (6'4, 306); 50 Jordon Thomas – freshman (6'3, 273); 55 David Abiara – freshman (6'4, 256); 88 Barryn Sorrell – freshman (6’3, 246); 90 Byron Murphy II – freshman (6'1, 297); 91 Sawyer Goram-Welch – (redshirt) freshman (6'4, 301); 92 Myron Warren – sophomore (6'2, 285); 93 T'Vondre Sweat – junior (6'4, 335); 95 Alfred Collins – sophomore (6'5, 302); 97 Patrick Bayouth – sophomore (6'4, 280); 98 Moro Ojomo – junior (6'3, 286); 99 Keondre Coburn – junior (6'2, 346); Deep Snapper: 43 Zach Edwards – junior (5’11, 211); 47 Chandler Kelehan – junior (6’1, 195); 54 Justin Mader – senior (6'2, 236)	Linebacker: 0 DeMarvion Overshown – Senior (6'4, 223); 6 Ben Davis – Senior (6'4, 236); 13 Marcus Tillman, Jr. – sophomore (6'1, 239); 18 Ovie Oghoufo – junior (6'3, 237); 29 Jaden Hullaby – (redshirt) freshman (6'2, 223); 30 Devin Richardson – junior (6'3, 233); 33 David Gbenda – sophomore (6'0, 224); 35 Terrence Cooks II – freshman (6'2, 220); 37 Morice Blackwell Jr. – freshman (6'1, 203); 40 Ayodele Adeoye – junior (6’1, 240); 41 Jaylan Ford – sophomore (6'2, 230); 42 D.J. Harris Jr. – freshman (6’2, 226); 46 Ray Thornton – senior (6'3, 238); 47 Luke Brockermeyer – junior (6'3, 225); 51 Marshall Landwehr – freshman (6'0, 218); 52 Jett Bush – junior (6'2, 236); 53 Carlton Smith – senior (6'3, 237); Defensive back: 1 Chris Adimora – junior (6'1, 204); 4 Darion Dunn – senior (6'1, 192); 5 D'Shawn Jamison – senior (5'10, 184); 9 Josh Thompson – senior (6’0, 191); 11 Anthony Cook – senior (6’1, 191); 14 Brenden Schooler – senior (6’2, 206); 19 Ishmael Ibraheem – freshman (6'1, 160); 21 Kitan Crawford – sophomore (5’11, 196); 23 Jahdae Barron – sophomore (5’11, 186); 24 Marques Caldwell – sophomore (6'1, 198); 25 B.J. Foster – senior (6'2, 199); 26 Christian Tschauner – sophomore (5'11, 188); 27 JD Coffey III – freshman (6’0, 183); 28 Jerrin Thompson – sophomore (6’0, 188); 31 Jamier Johnson – freshman (6'0, 166); 36 Michael Taaffe – freshman (6'0, 182); 37 Doak Wilson – sophomore (6'0, 190); 38 Tremayne Prudhomme – junior (6'1, 187); 39 Turner Symonds – junior (6’1, 178); 44 Tannahill Love – (redshirt) freshman (5’11, 213); 44 Tyler Owens – junior (6'2, 203); 49 Thatcher Milton – freshman (5’10, 181); Legend: (C) Team captain; (S) Suspended; (I) Ineligible; Redshirt

=== Depth chart ===
Defense

FS
Brenden Schooler
Jerrin Thompson
JD Coffey III

JACK	WILL	MIKE	SAM
Alfred Collins	DeMarvion Overshown	Luke Brockermeyer	Ovie Oghoufo
Jett Bush	David Gbenda	Jaylan Ford	Ben Davis
Barryn Sorrell	Ayodele Adeoye	Devin Richardson	—

SS
B.J. Foster
Chris Adimora
—

CB
Jahdae Barron
Kitan Crawford
—

DE	NT	DE
Ray Thornton	Keondre Coburn	Moro Ojomo
Ovie Oghoufo	T'Vondre Sweat	Vernon Broughton
DJ Harris Jr.	Byron Murphy II	Sawyer Goram-Welch

CB
D'Shawn Jamison
Darion Dunn
Jamier Johnson

Offense

WR
Xavier Worthy
Al'vonte Woodard
—

WR
Kelvontay Dixon
Jordan Whittington
Casey Cain

LT	LG	C	RG	RT
Christian Jones	Junior Angilau	Jake Majors	Tope Imade	Derek Kerstetter
Andrej Karic	Hayden Conner	Logan Parr	Hayden Conner	Andrej Karic
—	Isaiah Hookfin	Rafiti Ghirmai	Isaiah Hookfin	—

TE
Cade Brewer
Jared Wiley
Gunnar Helm

WR
Marcus Washington
Kai Money
—

QB
Casey Thompson
Hudson Card
Ben Ballard

Key reserves
Season-ending injury
- Jaden Alexis
- Brayden Liebrock
- Ishmael Ibraheem
- Troy Omeire
- Denzel Okafor
- Jacoby Jones
Injury
Suspension

RB
Bijan Robinson
Roschon Johnson
Keilan Robinson

Special teams
PK Cameron Dicker
P Cameron Dicker
KR D'Shawn Jamison
PR D'Shawn Jamison
LS Justin Mader
H Zach Edwards

True Freshman

== Game summaries ==
=== Vs. No. 23 Louisiana ===
Team	1	2	3	4	Total
No. 23 Louisiana	3	3	6	6	18
• No. 21 Texas	7	7	14	10	38

- Date: September 4
- Location: Darrell K Royal–Texas Memorial Stadium (Austin, TX)
- Game start: 3:30 p.m.
- Game attendance: 91,113
- Game weather: 97, Sunny, Wind SE @ 9 mph
- Referee: Tuta Salaam
- TV announcers (FOX): Tim Brando (play-by-play) and Spencer Tillman (color)
- Sources:Stats

Statistics	Louisiana	Texas
First downs	24	20
Total yards	359	435
Rushing yards	77	170
Passing yards	282	265
Turnovers	1	0
Time of possession	26:47	33:13

Team	Category	Player	Statistics
Louisiana	Passing	Levi Lewis	28–40, 282 yards, 1 TDs
Louisiana	Rushing	Chris Smith	11 carries, 55 yards, 1 TDs
Louisiana	Receiving	Jalen Williams	5 receptions, 71 yards, 0 TDs
Texas	Passing	Hudson Card	14–21, 224 yards, 2 TDs
Texas	Rushing	Bijan Robinson	20 carries, 103 yards, 1 TDs
Texas	Receiving	Jordan Whittington	7 receptions, 113 yards, 1 TDs

=== At Arkansas ===
Team	1	2	3	4	Total
No. 15 Texas	0	0	7	14	21
• Arkansas	3	13	17	7	40

- Date: September 11
- Location: Donald W. Reynolds Razorback Stadium (Fayetteville, AR)
- Game start: 6:00 p.m.
- Game attendance: 74,531
- Game weather: 90, Sunny, Wind SSE @ 11 mph
- Referee: Brandon Cruse
- TV announcers (ESPN): Joe Tessitore (play-by-play), Greg McElroy (color), and Katie George (sideline)
- Sources:Stats

Statistics	Texas	Arkansas
First downs	15	20
Total yards	256	471
Rushing yards	138	333
Passing yards	118	138
Turnovers	1	1
Time of possession	29:00	31:00

Team	Category	Player	Statistics
Texas	Passing	Hudson Card	8–15, 61 yards, 0 TDs
Texas	Rushing	Bijan Robinson	19 carries, 69 yards, 1 TDs
Texas	Receiving	Xavier Worthy	2 receptions, 41 yards, 0 TDs
Arkansas	Passing	KJ Jefferson	14–19, 138 yards, 0 TDs, 1 INT
Arkansas	Rushing	Trelon Smith	12 carries, 75 yards, 1 TDs
Arkansas	Receiving	Tyson Morris	1 receptions, 45 yards, 0 TDs

=== Vs. Rice ===
Team	1	2	3	4	Total
Rice	0	0	0	0	0
• Texas	16	28	14	0	58

- Date: September 18
- Location: Darrell K Royal–Texas Memorial Stadium (Austin, TX)
- Game start: 7:00 p.m.
- Game attendance: 91,978
- Game weather: 91, Sunny, Wind E @ 8 mph
- Referee: Kevin Mar
- TV announcers (LHN): Lowell Galindo (play-by-play), Sam Acho (color), and Alex Chappell (sideline)
- Sources:Stats

Statistics	Rice	Texas
First downs	14	26
Total yards	284	620
Rushing yards	156	427
Passing yards	128	193
Turnovers	1	1
Time of possession	30:34	29:26

Team	Category	Player	Statistics
Rice	Passing	Jake Constantine	12–15, 80 yards, 0 TDs
Rice	Rushing	Khalan Griffin	7 carries, 52 yards, 0 TDs
Rice	Receiving	Jack Bradley	3 receptions, 25 yards, 0 TDs
Texas	Passing	Casey Thompson	15–18, 164 yards, 2 TDs, 1 INT
Texas	Rushing	Bijan Robinson	13 carries, 127 yards, 3 TDs
Texas	Receiving	Xavier Worthy	7 receptions, 88 yards, 1 TDs

=== Vs. Texas Tech ===
Team	1	2	3	4	Total
Texas Tech	0	14	14	7	35
• Texas	14	28	21	7	70

- Date: September 25
- Location: Darrell K Royal–Texas Memorial Stadium (Austin, TX)
- Game start: 11:00 a.m.
- Game attendance: 98,349
- Game weather: 74, Sunny, Wind @ 0 mph
- Referee: Kevin Hassell
- TV announcers (ABC): Dave Pasch (play-by-play), Dusty Dvoracek (color), and Tom Luginbill (sideline)
- Sources:Stats

Statistics	Texas Tech	Texas
First downs	20	27
Total yards	520	639
Rushing yards	128	336
Passing yards	392	303
Turnovers	2	1
Time of possession	29:54	30:06

Team	Category	Player	Statistics
Texas Tech	Passing	Henry Colombi	17–23, 324 yards, 3 TDs, 1 INT
Texas Tech	Rushing	SaRodorick Thompson	16 carries, 54 yards, 0 TDs
Texas Tech	Receiving	Kaylon Geiger	5 receptions, 100 yards, 1 TDs
Texas	Passing	Casey Thompson	18–23, 303 yards, 5 TDs, 1 INT
Texas	Rushing	Bijan Robinson	18 carries, 137 yards, 0 TDs
Texas	Receiving	Xavier Worthy	5 receptions, 100 yards, 3 TDs

=== At TCU ===
Team	1	2	3	4	Total
• Texas	13	10	3	6	32
TCU	14	3	3	7	27

- Date: October 2
- Location: Amon G. Carter Stadium (Fort Worth, TX)
- Game start: 11:00 a.m.
- Game attendance: 43,337
- Game weather: 75, Cloudy, Wind SW @ 6 mph
- Referee: Tuta Salaam
- TV announcers (ABC): Dave Pasch (play-by-play), Dusty Dvoracek (color), and Tom Luginbill (sideline)
- Sources:Stats

Statistics	Texas	TCU
First downs	25	23
Total yards	414	351
Rushing yards	272	169
Passing yards	142	182
Turnovers	1	3
Time of possession	32:41	27:10

Team	Category	Player	Statistics
Texas	Passing	Casey Thompson	12–22, 142 yards, 1 TDs, 1 INT
Texas	Rushing	Bijan Robinson	35 carries, 216 yards, 2 TDs
Texas	Receiving	Jordan Whittington	3 receptions, 79 yards, 1 TDs
TCU	Passing	Max Duggan	20–28, 182 yards, 1 TDs, 0 INT
TCU	Rushing	Zach Evans	15 carries, 113 yards, 1 TDs
TCU	Receiving	Taye Barber	3 receptions, 37 yards, 0 TDs

=== Vs. No. 6 Oklahoma ===
Red River Showdown

Team	1	2	3	4	Total
• No. 6 Oklahoma	7	13	10	25	55
No. 21 Texas	28	10	3	7	48

- Date: October 9
- Location: Cotton Bowl (Dallas, TX)
- Game start: 11:00 a.m.
- Game attendance: 92,100
- Game weather: 76, Sunny, Wind SSW @ 16 mph
- Referee: Scott Campbell
- TV announcers (ABC): Chris Fowler (play-by-play), Kirk Herbstreit (analyst), and Holly Rowe (sideline)
- Sources:Stats

Statistics	Oklahoma	Texas
First downs	26	19
Total yards	662	516
Rushing yards	339	128
Passing yards	323	388
Turnovers	2	1
Time of possession	35:23	24:24

Team	Category	Player	Statistics
Oklahoma	Passing	Caleb Williams	15–24, 211 yards, 2 TDs, 0 INT
Oklahoma	Rushing	Kennedy Brooks	25 carries, 217 yards, 2 TDs
Oklahoma	Receiving	Marvin Mims	5 receptions, 136 yards, 2 TDs
Texas	Passing	Casey Thompson	20–34, 388 yards, 5 TDs, 0 INT
Texas	Rushing	Bijan Robinson	20 carries, 137 yards, 1 TDs
Texas	Receiving	Xavier Worthy	9 receptions, 261 yards, 2 TDs

=== Vs. No. 12 Oklahoma State ===
Team	1	2	3	4	Total
• No. 12 Oklahoma State	3	10	3	16	32
No. 25 Texas	10	7	7	0	24

- Date: October 16
- Location: Darrell K Royal–Texas Memorial Stadium (Austin, TX)
- Game start: 11:00 a.m.
- Game attendance: 99,916
- Game weather: 64, Sunny, Wind NNE @ 0 mph
- Referee: Michael Vandervelde
- TV announcers (FOX): Gus Johnson (Play-by-Play), Joel Klatt (analyst), Jenny Taft (sideline)
- Sources:Stats

Statistics	Oklahoma State	Texas
First downs	25	16
Total yards	398	317
Rushing yards	220	138
Passing yards	178	179
Turnovers	1	2
Time of possession	33:43	26:17

Team	Category	Player	Statistics
Oklahoma State	Passing	Spencer Sanders	19–32, 178 yards, 1 TDs, 1 INT
Oklahoma State	Rushing	Jaylen Warren	33 carries, 193 yards, 0 TDs
Oklahoma State	Receiving	Tay Martin	6 receptions, 48 yards, 0 TDs
Texas	Passing	Casey Thompson	15–27, 179 yards, 1 TDs, 2 INT
Texas	Rushing	Bijan Robinson	21 carries, 135 yards, 2 TDs
Texas	Receiving	Marcus Washington	2 receptions, 60 yards, 0 TDs

=== At No. 16 Baylor ===
Team	1	2	3	4	Total
Texas	14	0	7	3	24
• No. 16 Baylor	10	0	7	14	31

- Date: October 30
- Location: McLane Stadium (Waco, TX)
- Game start: 11:00 a.m.
- Game attendance: 45,834
- Game weather: 61, Sunny, Wind NE @ 4 mph
- Referee: David Alvarez
- TV announcers (ABC): Joe Tessitore (play-by-play), Greg McElroy (color), and Katie George (sideline)
- Sources:Stats

Statistics	Texas	Baylor
First downs	18	23
Total yards	382	427
Rushing yards	102	199
Passing yards	280	228
Turnovers	2	2
Time of possession	27:06	32:54

Team	Category	Player	Statistics
Texas	Passing	Casey Thompson	23-38, 280 yards, 2 TDs, 1 INT
Texas	Rushing	Bijan Robinson	17 carries, 47 yards, 1 TDs
Texas	Receiving	Xavier Worthy	4 receptions, 115 yards, 1 TDs
Baylor	Passing	Gerry Bohanon	18–31, 222 yards, 0 TDs, 2 INT
Baylor	Rushing	Abram Smith	20 carries, 121 yards, 1 TDs
Baylor	Receiving	R. J. Sneed	8 receptions, 94 yards, 1 TDs

=== At Iowa State ===
Team	1	2	3	4	Total
Texas	0	7	0	0	7
• Iowa State	3	0	21	6	30

- Date: November 6
- Location: Jack Trice Stadium (Ames, IA)
- Game start: 6:30 p.m.
- Game attendance: 61,500
- Game weather: 63, Sunny, Wind S @ 8 mph
- Referee: Kevin Hassell
- TV announcers (FS1): Aaron Goldsmith (play-by-play) and Mark Helfrich (color)
- Sources:Stats

Statistics	Texas	Iowa State
First downs	11	23
Total yards	207	476
Rushing yards	104	175
Passing yards	103	301
Turnovers	2	1
Time of possession	25:02	34:58

Team	Category	Player	Statistics
Texas	Passing	Hudson Card	14-23, 101 yards, 1 TDs, 0 INT
Texas	Rushing	Bijan Robinson	18 carries, 90 yards, 0 TDs
Texas	Receiving	Xavier Worthy	2 receptions, 22 yards, 1 TDs
Iowa State	Passing	Brock Purdy	27-38, 252 yards, 0 TDs, 0 INT
Iowa State	Rushing	Breece Hall	19 carries, 136 yards, 2 TDs
Iowa State	Receiving	Xavier Hutchinson	8 receptions, 96 yards, 0 TDs

=== Vs. Kansas ===
Team	1	2	3	4	OT	Total
• Kansas	14	21	7	7	8	57
Texas	0	14	21	14	7	56

- Date: November 13
- Location: Darrell K Royal–Texas Memorial Stadium (Austin, TX)
- Game start: 6:30 p.m.
- Game attendance: 95,202
- Game weather: Sunny
- Referee: David Alvarez
- TV announcers (ESPNU): Roy Philpott (play-by-play) and Kelly Stouffer (color)
- Sources:Stats

Statistics	Kansas	Texas
First downs	22	30
Total yards	420	574
Rushing yards	218	164
Passing yards	202	410
Turnovers	0	4
Time of possession	35:18	24:42

Team	Category	Player	Statistics
Kansas	Passing	Jalon Daniels	21-30, 202 yards, 3 TD, 0 INT
Kansas	Rushing	Devin Neal	24 carries, 143 yards, 3 TD
Kansas	Receiving	Kwamie Lassiter II	8 receptions, 68 yards, TD
Texas	Passing	Casey Thompson	30-43, 358 yards, 6 TD, INT
Texas	Rushing	Bijan Robinson	14 carries, 70 yards
Texas	Receiving	Xavier Worthy	14 receptions, 152 yards, 3 TD

=== At West Virginia ===
Team	1	2	3	4	Total
Texas	0	10	7	6	23
• West Virginia	7	14	7	3	31

- Date: November 20
- Location: Milan Puskar Stadium (Morgantown, WV)
- Game start: 11:00 a.m.
- Game attendance: 48,755
- Game weather: 42, Cloudy, Wind S @ 6 mph
- Referee: Scott Campbell
- TV announcers (ESPN2): Anish Shroff (play-by-play), Mike Golic Jr. (color), and Taylor McGregor (sideline)
- Sources:Stats

Statistics	Texas	West Virginia
First downs	16	28
Total yards	355	459
Rushing yards	203	158
Passing yards	152	301
Turnovers	1	0
Time of possession	21:24	38:36

Team	Category	Player	Statistics
Texas	Passing	Hudson Card	10-16, 123 yards, 1 TD, 0 INT
Texas	Rushing	Keilan Robinson	9 carries, 111 yards, 1 TD
Texas	Receiving	Xavier Worthy	7 receptions, 85 yards, 1 TD
West Virginia	Passing	Jarret Doege	27-43, 290 yards, 3 TD, 0 INT
West Virginia	Rushing	Leddie Brown	33 carries, 158 yards, 1 TD
West Virginia	Receiving	Winston Wright	6 receptions, 67 yards, 1 TD

=== Vs. Kansas State ===
Team	1	2	3	4	Total
Kansas State	7	10	0	0	17
• Texas	7	9	3	3	22

- Date: November 26
- Location: Darrell K Royal–Texas Memorial Stadium (Austin, TX)
- Game start: 11:00 a.m.
- Game attendance: 75,072
- Game weather: Sunny
- Referee: Kevin Mar
- TV announcers (FOX): Aaron Goldsmith (play-by-play) and Mark Helfrich (color)
- Sources:Stats

Statistics	Kansas State	Texas
First downs	13	20
Total yards	293	381
Rushing yards	228	209
Passing yards	65	172
Turnovers	0	1
Time of possession	26:30	33:30

Team	Category	Player	Statistics
Kansas State	Passing	Will Howard	9-13, 65 yards, 0 TD, 0 INT
Kansas State	Rushing	Deuce Vaughn	24 carries, 143 yards, 1 TD
Kansas State	Receiving	Tyrone Howell	1 receptions, 14 yards, 0 TD
Texas	Passing	Casey Thompson	17-23, 170 yards, 1 TD, 1 INT
Texas	Rushing	Roschon Johnson	31 carries, 179 yards, 1 TD
Texas	Receiving	Xavier Worthy	6 receptions, 65 yards, 0 TD

This was the fifth consecutive win for Texas over Kansas State. With two field goals from Longhorn Cameron Dicker, Texas pulled ahead to win. The final score of the game was Texas 22, Kansas State 17.

Although Texas won the game and broke a six-game losing streak (its worst since 1956), they ended the season at 5 wins and 7 losses (3-6 in the conference) and were not bowl eligible. Kansas State's regular season record concluded at 7-5 (4-5 in conference), and the Wildcats were invited to the Texas Bowl to play LSU.

== Statistics ==
Team Statistics
	Texas	Opponents
Total Points	423	373
Total Points per game	35.25	31.08
Total Touchdowns	55	44
Total First Downs	247	261
Rushing	120	117
Passing	114	127
Penalties	13	17
Rushing Total Yards	2,604 yrds	2,666 yrds
Rushing yards for loss	212 yds	235 yds
Rushing Attempts	457	470
Average Per Rushing ATTs	5.2	5.2
Average Per Game	199.3	202.6
Rushing TDs	25	26
Passing total yards	2,705 yrds	2,688 yrds
Comp–Att-INTs	217-346-10	255-377-7
Average Per Game	225.42	224.0
Average per attempt	7.82	7.13
Passing TDs	29	16
Total Offensive plays	803	847
Total Yards	5,097 yds	5,119 yds
Average per plays	6.3	6.0
Average per games	424.8	426.6
Kickoff Returns: # – Yards- TDs	26-504-0	19-498-0
Average per kickoff	19.38	26.21
Punt Returns: # – Yards- TDs	18-202-0	14-40-0
Average per punt	11.22	2.86
INT Returns: # – Yards- TDs	7-91-0	10-197-0
Average per interceptions	13.0	19.70
Kicking - Punt Yards	49-2,234	50-2,055
Punt average per games	45.59	41.10
Punt net. average	43.55	35.06
FG: FGM - FGA	13-15	22-25
Onside kicks	0-1	0-2
Penalties – Yards	69-579	53-442
Average per games (YRDS)	48.25	36.83
Time of possession	05:37:08	06:22:52
Average per game	28:06	31:54
Miscellaneous: 3rd–Down Conversion %	43.75%	42.35%
Miscellaneous:4th–Down Conversion %	47.37%	57.89%
Sacks - Yards	20–113	26–155
Fumbles – Fumbles Lost	15-8	11–7
Miscellaneous: Yards	0	0
Red Zone: Score attempts	44-47	44-51
Red Zone: Touchdowns	35-47	29–51

=== Offense ===
Passing statistics
#	NAME	POS	RAT	CMP	ATT	YDS	TD	INT	%	AVG
#1	Hudson Card	QB	138.63	51	83	590 yds	5 TDs	1 INTs	61.45%	73.75
#2	Roschon Johnson	RB	116.80	1	1	2 yds	0 TDs	0 INTs	100.0%	0.17
#11	Casey Thompson	QB	154.67	165	261	2,113 yds	24 TDs	9 INTs	63.22%	176.08
	TOTALS		150.27	217	346	2,705 yds	29 TDs	10 INTs	62.72%	225.42
	OPPONENTS		137.82	255	377	2,688 yds	16 TDs	7 INTs	67.64%	224.0

Legend
High	Team high

Rushing statistics
#	NAME	POS	CAR	YDS	AVG	LONG	TD	AVG/PG
#1	Hudson Card	QB	26 car	17 yds	0.7	13	1 TDs	2.13
#2	Roschon Johnson	RB	96 car	569 yds	5.9	72	5 TDs	47.42
#4	Jordan Whittington	WR	1 car	8 yds	8.0	8	0 TDs	1.0
#5	Bijan Robinson	RB	195 car	1,127 yds	5.8	62	11 TDs	112.70
#7	Keilan Robinson	RB	45 car	322 yds	7.2	65	3 TDs	29.27
#8	Xavier Worthy	WR	1 car	7 yds	7.0	7	0 TDs	0.58
#11	Casey Thompson	QB	55 car	157 yds	2.9	41	4 TDs	13.08
#17	Cameron Dicker	K	1 car	2 yds	2.0	2	0 TDs	0.17
#24	Jonathon Brooks	RB	21 car	143 yds	6.8	25	1 TDs	35.75
#33	Gabe Watson	RB	10 car	37 yds	3.7	11	0 TDs	12.33
#80	Cade Brewer	TE	1 car	2 yds	2.0	2	0 TDs	0.17
#81	Juan Davis	TE	1 car	3 yds	3.0	3	0 TDs	0.60
	TOTALS		457 car	2,392 yds	5.2	72	25 TDs	199.33
	OPPONENTS		470 car	2,431 yds	5.2	71	26 TDs	202.58

Legend
High	Team high

Receiving statistics
#	NAME	POS	REC	YDS	AVG	LONG	TD	AVG/PG
#2	Roschon Johnson	RB	11 rec	83 yds	7.55	14	0 TDs	6.92
#4	Jordan Whittington	WR	26 rec	377 yds	14.50	41	3 TDs	47.13
#5	Bijan Robinson	RB	26 rec	295 yds	11.35	38	4 TDs	29.50
#6	Joshua Moore	WR	24 rec	265 yds	11.04	48	3 TDs	29.44
#7	Keilan Robinson	RB	7 rec	57 yds	8.14	25	0 TDs	5.18
#8	Xavier Worthy	WR	62 rec	981 yds	15.82	75	12 TDs	81.75
#15	Marcus Washington	WR	18 rec	277 yds	15.39	58	2 TDs	23.08
#16	Kelvontay Dixon	WR	9 rec	100 yds	11.11	22	0 TDs	8.33
#18	Jared Wiley	TE	9 rec	67 yds	7.44	20	2 TDs	6.09
#24	Jonathan Brooks	RB	1 rec	12 yds	12.0	12	0 TDs	3.0
#80	Cade Brewer	TE	22 rec	184 yds	8.36	25	3 TDs	15.33
#81	Juan Davis	TE	1 rec	0 yds	0.0	0	0 TDs	0.0
#83	Kai Money	WR	1 rec	7 yds	7.0	7	0 TDs	2.33
	TOTALS		217 rec	2,705 yds	12.47	75	29 TDs	225.42
	OPPONENTS		255 rec	2,688 yds	10.54	75	16 TDs	224.0

Legend
High	Team high

=== Defense ===
Defense statistics
#	NAME	POS	SOLO	AST	TOT	TFL-YDS	SACK-YDS	INT	TD	YRDs	BU	QBH	FR	FF	FFTD	KICK	BLK	SAF
#0	DeMarvion Overshown	LB	38	36	74.0	5.5-19	2.0–14	-	-	2	2	2	-	–	–	1	-	-
#1	Chris Adimora	DB	5	5	10.0	0.5–5	0.5–5	-	-	-	2	–	–	–	–	–	-	-
#1	Hudson Card	QB	1	-	1.0	0–0	0–0	-	-	–	–	–	–	–	–	–	-	-
#2	Roschon Johnson	RB	-	1	1.0	0–0	0–0	–	-	-	-	-	–	–	–	–	-	-
#3	Jacoby Jones	DL	9	11	20.0	2.5–11	0–0	–	-	–	–	2	–	–	–	–	-	-
#4	Darion Dunn	DB	16	6	22.0	1.0-2	0-0	-	–	–	2	–	-	1	–	–	-	-
#5	D'Shawn Jamison	DB	34	14	48.0	0–0	0–0	1	-	-	1	1	1	–	–	–	-	-
#6	Ben Davis	LB	11	5	16.0	4.5-24	2.5–21	–	–	–	–	1	1	1	–	-	-	-
#6	Joshua Moore	WR	1	–	1.0	0–0	0–0	–	–	–	–	–	-	–	–	-	-	-
#7	Keilan Robinson	RB	2	–	2.0	0–0	0–0	–	–	–	–	–	–	–	–	1	-	-
#8	Xavier Worthy	WR	1	1	2.0	0-0	0-0	-	-	-	-	-	–	–	–	–	-	-
#9	Josh Thompson	DB	23	11	34.0	1.0–1	0–0	1	-	–	2	1	1	–	–	–	-	-
#11	Anthony Cook	DB	27	19	46.0	3.0–12	1.0–7	-	-	-	3	1	1	1	–	–	-	-
#14	Brenden Schooler	DB	36	14	50.0	1.5–3	0.5–1	–	–	–	2	–	–	1	–	-	-	-
#15	Marcus Washington	WR	-	-	-	0–0	0–0	–	–	-	–	–	–	1	–	-	-	-
#17	Cameron Dicker	K	2	-	2.0	0–0	0–0	–	–	–	–	–	–	–	–	-	-	-
#18	Ovie Oghoufo	DL	21	21	42.0	5.5–13	2.0–7	–	–	–	2	2	–	–	–	-	-	-
#18	Jared Wiley	TE	1	-	1.0	0–0	0–0	-	–	–	–	–	–	–	–	-	-	-
#21	Kitan Crawford	DB	5	0	5.0	0-0	0–0	-	-	-	–	–	–	–	–	-	-	-
#23	Jahdae Barron	DB	12	6	18	1.0–1	0–0	–	–	-	3	–	–	1	–	-	-	-
#25	B.J. Foster	DB	26	21	47.0	2.5–8	0–0	3	–	–	2	1	–	–	–	-	-	-
#27	JD Coffey III	DB	2	3	5.0	0–0	0–0	–	–	-	–	–	–	–	–	-	-	-
#28	Jerrin Thompson	DB	26	15	41.0	3.0–6	0–0	–	-	-	3	1	–	1	–	-	-	-
#30	Devin Richardson	LB	2	2	4.0	0–0	0–0	–	-	-	-	-	–	-	–	-	-	-
#31	Jamier Johnson	DB	1	1	2.0	3.0–6	0–0	–	-	-	-	-	–	-	–	-	-	-
#32	Prince Dorbah	DL	1	2	3.0	0–0	0–0	–	-	-	-	-	–	-	–	-	-	-
#33	David Gbenda	LB	17	10	27.0	2.5–6	1.5–3	–	-	-	2	-	–	-	–	-	-	-
#37	Morice Blackwell Jr.	LB	3	-	3.0	0.0–0	0–0	–	-	-	-	1	–	-	–	-	-	-
#40	Ayodele Adeoye	LB	4	3	7.0	1.0–2	0–0	–	-	-	-	-	–	-	–	-	-	-
#41	Jaylan Ford	LB	29	24	53.0	6.0–6	0–0	–	-	-	-	1	–	-	–	-	-	-
#42	D.J. Harris Jr.	DL	2	-	2.0	1.0–2	1.0–2	–	-	-	-	-	–	-	–	-	-	-
#43	Jett Bush	LB	9	5	14.0	3.5–16	1.0–9	–	-	-	-	-	–	-	–	-	-	-
#45	Vernon Broughton	DL	1	4	5.0	0.5–2	0.5–2	–	-	-	-	-	–	-	–	-	-	-
#46	Ray Thornton	DL	17	14	31.0	4.5–16	1.0–6	–	-	-	-	-	–	-	–	-	-	-
#47	Luke Brockermeyer	LB	36	36	72.0	5.0–9	0.5–4	2	-	-	1	2	–	-	–	-	-	-
#67	Tope Imade	OL	-	1	1.0	0–0	0–0	–	-	-	-	-	–	-	–	-	-	-
#69	Andrej Karic	OL	1	-	1.0	0–0	0–0	–	-	-	-	-	–	-	–	-	-	-
#80	Cade Brewer	TE	1	-	1.0	0–0	0–0	–	-	-	-	-	–	-	–	-	-	-
#88	Barryn Sorrell	DL	3	4	7.0	1.0–3	0–0	–	-	-	-	-	–	-	–	-	-	-
#90	Byron Murphy II	DL	10	5	15.0	3.5–9	2.0–6	–	-	-	-	-	–	-	–	-	-	-
#91	Sawyer Goram-Welch	DL	-	1	1.0	0–0	0–0	–	-	-	-	-	–	-	–	-	-	-
#92	Myron Warren	DL	1	2	3.0	0–0	0–0	–	-	-	-	-	–	-	–	-	-	-
#93	T'Vondre Sweat	DL	9	13	22.0	2.0–6	1.0–4	–	-	-	3	-	–	-	–	-	-	-
#95	Alfred Collins	DL	15	10	25.0	5.0–21	2.0–15	–	-	-	-	4	–	1	–	-	-	-
#97	Patrick Bayouth	DL	-	2	2.0	0.0–0	0–0	–	-	-	-	-	–	-	–	-	-	-
#98	Moro Ojomo	DL	17	12	29.0	3.0–4	0–0	–	-	-	1	3	–	-	–	-	-	-
#99	Keondre Coburn	DL	9	6	15.0	2.0–8	1.0–7	–	-	-	-	1	–	-	–	1	-	-
	TOTAL		491	346	837.0	72.0-215	20.0-113	7	-	–	31	24	6	7	-	5	-	1
	OPPONENTS		450	360	810	64.0–226	26.0–155	10	-	–	25	37	8	11	–	2	-	-

Key: POS: Position, SOLO: Solo Tackles, AST: Assisted Tackles, TOT: Total Tackles, TFL: Tackles-for-loss, SACK: Quarterback Sacks, INT: Interceptions, BU: Passes Broken Up, PD: Passes Defended, QBH: Quarterback Hits, FR: Fumbles Recovered, FF: Forced Fumbles, BLK: Kicks or Punts Blocked, SAF: Safeties, TD : Touchdown

Legend
High	Team high

=== Special teams ===
Kicking statistics
#	NAME	POS	XPM	XPA	XP%	FGM	FGA	FG%	1–19	20–29	30–39	40–49	50+	LNG	BLK
#17	Cameron Dicker	K	49	50	100%	13	15	86.67%	0-0	6-6	4-4	2-3	1-2	50	-
	TOTALS		49	50	100%	13	15	86.67%	0-0	6-6	4-4	2-3	1-2	51	-

== Awards and honors ==
=== Big 12 Conference Awards ===
First Team Big 12 All-Conference

First Team Big 12 All-Conference
Player	No.	Position	Class
Bijan Robinson	5	RB	So- Also set Texas record for most rushing yards ever
Xavier Worthy	8	WR	Fr
Cameron Dicker	17	K	Sr
Derek Kerstetter	68	OL	Jr

Big 12 Conference Offensive Freshman of the Year

Big 12 Offensive Freshman of the Year
Player	No.	Position	Class
Xavier Worthy	8	WR	Fr

== Rankings ==
Ranking movements Legend: ██ Increase in ranking ██ Decrease in ranking — = Not ranked RV = Received votes
	Week															
Poll	Pre	1	2	3	4	5	6	7	8	9	10	11	12	13	14	Final
AP	21	15	RV	RV	RV	21	25	RV	RV	—	—	—	—	—	—	—
Coaches	19	15	RV	RV	RV	23	RV	RV	RV	—	—	—	—	—	—	—
CFP	Not released									—	—	—	—	—	—	Not released
