= Terry Joseph =

American football coach (born 1973)

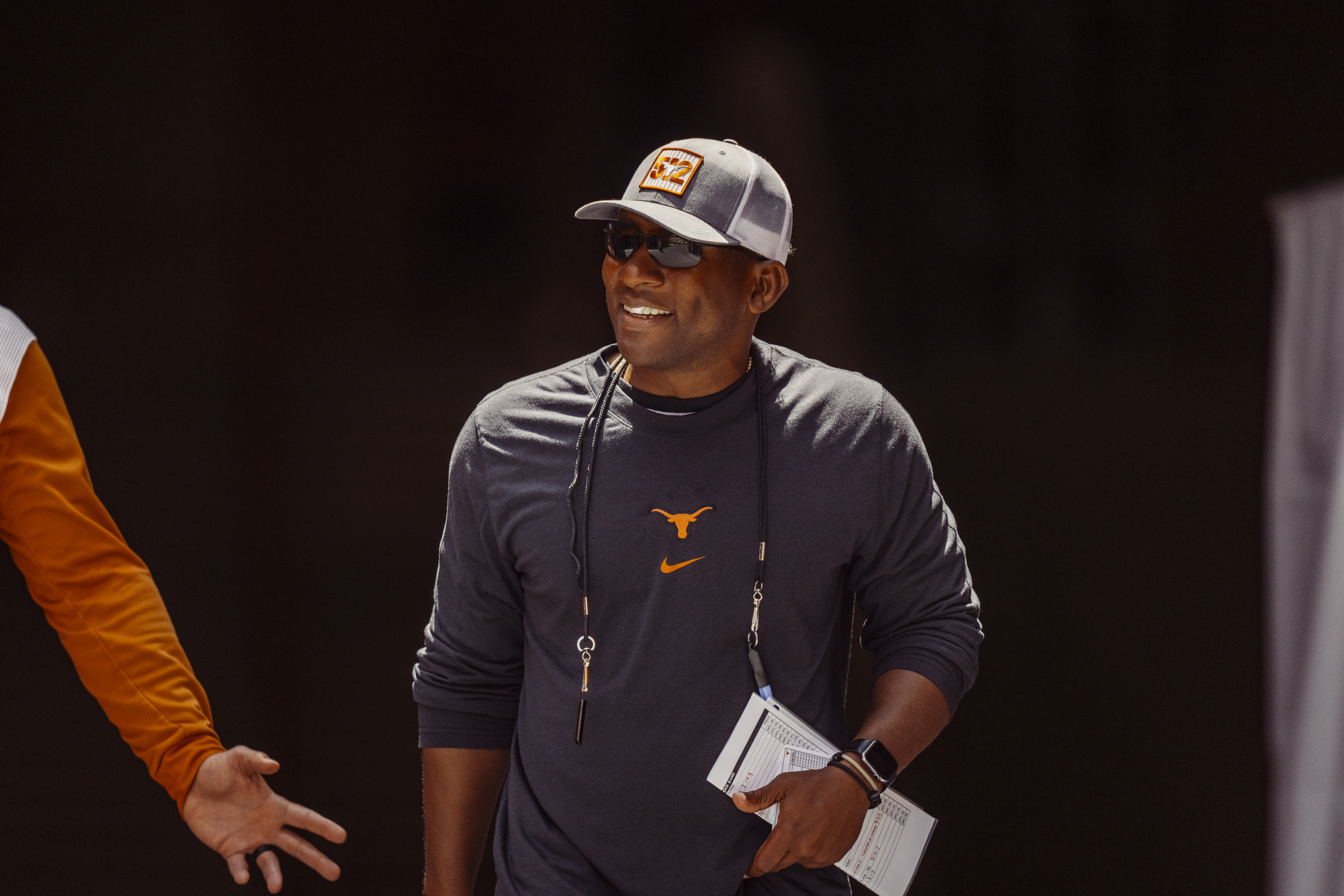
- Joseph coaching at the University of Texas

Current position
- Title: Defense passing game coordinator
- Team: New Orleans Saints

Biographical details
- Born: November 20, 1973 (age 52); New Orleans, Louisiana, U.S.
- Education: Northwestern State University (1996)

Playing career

Baseball
- 1992–1995: Northwestern State
- Position: Outfielder

Coaching career (HC unless noted)
- 1999–2002: Archbishop Shaw HS (LA) (STC/secondary)
- 2003–2005: Destrehan HS (LA) (DC)
- 2006: LSU (GA)
- 2007–2009: Louisiana Tech (DB/RC)
- 2010–2011: Tennessee (DB/RC)
- 2012–2013: Nebraska (DB)
- 2014–2016: Texas A&M (DB)
- 2017: North Carolina (DB)
- 2018–2020: Notre Dame (DB/PGC)
- 2021–2024: Texas (DPGC/secondary)
- 2025-Present: New Orleans Saints (DPGC)

Terry Joseph (born November 20, 1973), is an American football coach and former professional baseball outfielder. He currently serves as the defensive pass game coordinator for the New Orleans Saints of the National Football League (NFL).

== Coaching career ==
Joseph's coaching journey began at his alma mater, Archbishop Shaw High School, in New Orleans, Louisiana

Before joining Notre Dame, Joseph coached at several other Power 5 institutions. He coached at Nebraska, where his secondary led the nation in opponent completion percentage in a 10-win season for the team. While with the Cornhuskers, Joseph coached future NFL draft picks Stanley Jean-Baptiste and Daimion Stafford. Earlier in his career, Joseph coached at Tennessee and Louisiana Tech.

Joseph spent three seasons at Notre Dame from 2018–2020, where he contributed to the Fighting Irish's success in the College Football Playoff. Joseph coached standout safety Kyle Hamilton, who recorded multiple 1st-Team All-American Selections, recognition as a Bednarik Award Finalist, and a selection in the 1st Round of the 2022 NFL Draft. In addition to Hamilton, Joseph also coached DBs Alohi Gilman, Julian Love, and Troy Pride Jr. from their collegiate careers to eventual NFL draft selections.

On January 22, 2021, the University of Texas hired Joseph to serve as their defensive passing game coordinator and secondary coach. Joseph spent four seasons at the University of Texas from 2021–2024. During the 2021-2022 seasons, Joseph coached 6 total honorable mention All-Big 12 players, including Kansas City Chiefs defensive back Anthony Cook.

In 2023, the Longhorns recorded 16 interceptions, tied for 10th-most nationally. In his secondary, standout cornerback Jahdae Barron was named second-team All-Big 12 and was a Jim Thorpe Award Semifinalist. Fellow defensive back Ryan Watts was selected in the 6th round of the 2024 NFL Draft by the Pittsburgh Steelers after starting 22 games and earning the 2022 Big 12 Defensive Newcomer of the Year award.

On February 25, 2025, the New Orleans Saints hired Joseph to serve as the team's defensive pass game coordinator.

== Playing career ==
Terry Joseph
- Outfielder
- Bats: Right Throws: Right

Joseph played collegiate baseball at Northwestern State University. During his career, he was a 3-time All-Southland Conference selection and the 1995 Southland Conference Player of the Year. Joseph was selected in the 13th round of the 1995 MLB draft by the Chicago Cubs and spent 4 seasons playing in the Minor Leagues.
