= Keondre Coburn =

American football player (born 2000)

Profile
- Position: Defensive tackle

Personal information
- Born: May 23, 2000 (age 26); Tyler, Texas, U.S.
- Listed height: 6 ft 2 in (1.88 m)
- Listed weight: 332 lb (151 kg)

Career information
- High school: Westfield (Houston, Texas)
- College: Texas (2018–2022)
- NFL draft: 2023: 6th round, 194th overall pick

Career history
- Kansas City Chiefs (2023); Denver Broncos (2023)*; Kansas City Chiefs (2023)*; Tennessee Titans (2023–2024); Las Vegas Raiders (2025)*; Dallas Renegades (2026)*
- * Offseason or practice squad member only

Awards and highlights
- Second-team All-Big 12 (2022); Sugar Bowl Champion (2019); Alamo Bowl Champion (2019, 2020)

Career NFL statistics as of 2024
- Total tackles: 22
- Stats at Pro Football Reference

Keondre Coburn (born May 23, 2000) is an American professional football defensive tackle. He previously played for the Tennessee Titans of the NFL. He played college football for the Texas Longhorns.

== Early life ==
Coburn attended Westfield High School in Houston, Texas. As a senior, he had 56 tackles and 7.5 sacks. He played in the 2018 Under Armour All-America Game. Coburn committed to the University of Texas at Austin to play college football.

== College career ==
Coburn played college football at Texas from 2018 to 2022.

Coburn played in three games his freshman year in 2018 and took a redshirt. The Longhorns went on to go to the Big 12 Championship Game and win the Sugar Bowl. Coburn was named to the Academic All-Big12 Rookie team.

As a redshirt freshman in 2019, he started 12 of 13 games, recording 26 tackles and two sacks as he helped the Longhorns win the Alamo Bowl. He was also named 2nd team Academic All-Big 12.

As a sophomore he played in and started all 10 games and had 25 tackles and one sack and helped the Longhorns repeat as Alamo Bowl Champion. He was named a Big 12 All-Conference Honorable Mention.

Coburn was a captain of the 2021 team. He started 11 of 12 games, finishing with 15 tackles, a sack and a blocked extra point attempt. He was again named a Big 12 All-Conference Honorable Mention and also to the Big-12's Academic All Big-12 Team.

He returned to Texas for his senior year in 2022 and was again a team captain. He played in all 13 games again and had a career high 28 tackles as the Longhorns again went to the Alamo Bowl. For his efforts he was named 2nd Team All-Big12 Conference and an Honorable Mention for the Defensive Lineman of the Year award.

He finished his career playing in the East-West Shrine Bowl.

== Professional career ==
Pre-draft measurables
| Height | Weight | Arm length | Hand span | 40-yard dash | 10-yard split | 20-yard split | 20-yard shuttle | Three-cone drill | Vertical jump | Broad jump | Bench press |
|---|---|---|---|---|---|---|---|---|---|---|---|
| 6 ft 1 5/8 in (1.87 m) | 332 lb (151 kg) | 31 1/2 in (0.80 m) | 9 1/8 in (0.23 m) | 5.22 s | 1.82 s | 2.96 s | 4.70 s | 7.56 s | 27.5 in (0.70 m) | 8 ft 5 in (2.57 m) | 24 reps |

=== Kansas City Chiefs (first stint) ===
Coburn was selected by the Kansas City Chiefs in the sixth round (194th overall) of the 2023 NFL draft. He was waived on October 19, 2023, after playing in just one game.

=== Denver Broncos ===
On October 20, 2023, Coburn was claimed off waivers by the Denver Broncos. He was waived by the Broncos on November 14.

=== Kansas City Chiefs (second stint) ===
On November 16, 2023, Coburn was signed to the Kansas City Chiefs' practice squad.

=== Tennessee Titans ===
On December 13, 2023, the Tennessee Titans signed Coburn off the Chiefs practice squad. He played in four games for Tennessee during the 2023 season. The Chiefs went on to win the Super Bowl, but because he finished the season with the Titans, he was ineligible for their playoff bonuses or a Super Bowl Ring.

Coburn played in 15 games during the 2024 season and had his first career start during a Week four win against the Miami Dolphins. He recorded 14 tackles and played 144 snaps.

On March 7, 2025, Coburn signed a one-year contract extension with the Titans. He was waived by Tennessee during training camp on July 24.

=== Las Vegas Raiders ===
On July 25, 2025, Coburn was claimed off waivers by the Las Vegas Raiders. He was waived by the Raiders on August 25.

=== Dallas Renegades ===
On January 12, 2026, Coburn was allocated to the Dallas Renegades in the UFL regional allocation. On February 16, he was released by the Renegades.

== Career statistics ==
=== NFL ===
Legend
| **Bold** | Career high |

==== Regular season ====
| Year | Team | Games | | Tackles | | | | | Interceptions | | | | Fumbles | | | |
| Year | Team | GP | GS | Cmb | Solo | Ast | Sck | TFL | PD | Int | Yds | TD | FF | FR | Yds | TD |
|---|---|---|---|---|---|---|---|---|---|---|---|---|---|---|---|---|
| 2023 | KC | 1 | 0 | 1 | 1 | 0 | 0.0 | 1 | 0 | 0 | 0 | 0 | 0 | 0 | 0 | 0 |
| 2023 | TEN | 4 | 0 | 7 | 2 | 5 | 0.0 | 0 | 0 | 0 | 0 | 0 | 0 | 0 | 0 | 0 |
| 2024 | TEN | 15 | 1 | 14 | 7 | 7 | 0.0 | 0 | 0 | 0 | 0 | 0 | 0 | 0 | 0 | 0 |
| Career | | 20 | 1 | 22 | 10 | 12 | 0.0 | 1 | 0 | 0 | 0 | 0 | 0 | 0 | 0 | 0 |

=== College ===
| Year | Team | GP | Tackles | | | | | Interceptions | | | | | Fumbles | | | |
| Year | Team | GP | Solo | Ast | Cmb | TfL | Sck | Int | Yds | Avg | TD | PD | FR | Yds | TD | FF |
|---|---|---|---|---|---|---|---|---|---|---|---|---|---|---|---|---|
| 2018 | Texas | 3 | 2 | 0 | 2 | 0.0 | 0.0 | 0 | 0 | 0.0 | 0 | 0 | 0 | 0 | 0 | 0 |
| 2019 | Texas | 13 | 18 | 8 | 26 | 4.5 | 2.0 | 0 | 0 | 0.0 | 0 | 0 | 0 | 0 | 0 | 1 |
| 2020 | Texas | 10 | 13 | 12 | 25 | 4.5 | 1.0 | 0 | 0 | 0.0 | 0 | 2 | 0 | 0 | 0 | 0 |
| 2021 | Texas | 12 | 9 | 6 | 15 | 2.0 | 1.0 | 0 | 0 | 0.0 | 0 | 0 | 0 | 0 | 0 | 0 |
| 2022 | Texas | 13 | 10 | 18 | 28 | 3.0 | 1.5 | 0 | 0 | 0.0 | 0 | 0 | 0 | 0 | 0 | 1 |
| Career | | 51 | 52 | 44 | 96 | 14.0 | 5.5 | 0 | 0 | 0.0 | 0 | 2 | 0 | 0 | 0 | 2 |
