= Keilan Robinson =

American football player (born 2000)

Profile
- Position: Running back

Personal information
- Born: February 16, 2000 (age 26); Washington, D.C., U.S.
- Listed height: 5 ft 8 in (1.73 m)
- Listed weight: 191 lb (87 kg)

Career information
- High school: St. John's (Washington, D.C.)
- College: Alabama (2019–2020); Texas (2021–2023)
- NFL draft: 2024: 5th round, 167th overall pick

Career history
- Jacksonville Jaguars (2024); Philadelphia Eagles (2025)*; New York Jets (2025)*
- * Offseason or practice squad member only

Career NFL statistics as of 2025
- Return yards: 34
- Stats at Pro Football Reference

Keilan Robinson (born February 16, 2000) is an American professional football running back and return specialist. He played college football for the Alabama Crimson Tide and Texas Longhorns and was selected by the Jacksonville Jaguars in the fifth round of the 2024 NFL draft.

== Early life ==
Robinson attended St. John's College High School in Washington, D.C., where he was a top running back, being selected All-D.C. as a junior and senior while helping the team win the Washington Catholic Athletic Conference title. He was invited to play at the Under Armour All-America Game. He was ranked a four-star recruit, the second-best recruit in D.C., the 15th-best running back in the country, and the 244th-best player overall by 247Sports. He committed to play college football for the Alabama Crimson Tide.

== College career ==
Robinson totaled 34 carries for 254 yards and two touchdowns as a true freshman at Alabama in 2019 while appearing in eight games. He opted out during the 2020 season due to the COVID-19 pandemic, being inactive as the Crimson Tide went undefeated and won the 2021 College Football Playoff National Championship over the Ohio State Buckeyes, 52–24. Despite never playing a single game that season, Robinson was awarded three rings, one for each victory in the playoffs, and all three rings were later featured in a 2022 episode of Pawn Stars, in which they were sold for a total of $40,000.

Robinson entered the NCAA transfer portal following the season and ultimately transferred to the Texas Longhorns. In his first year at Texas, 2021, Robinson ran for 322 yards on 45 attempts while scoring three touchdowns, also having seven receptions for 57 yards while being named an honorable mention for the Big 12 Conference Newcomer of the Year award. The following season, he ran 25 times for 86 yards and caught 20 passes for 219 yards and three touchdowns. He also was a top special teams player and was an honorable mention for Big 12 Special Teams Player of the Year while being an honorable mention All-Big 12 return specialist. He was third in the conference for both kick returns yards, 405, and yards per return, 25.2, and had four tackles, a blocked punt return touchdown and a blocked punt. In his last year, 2023, Robinson totaled 12 rushes for 134 yards and three touchdowns, eight catches for 56 yards, and had 22 kick returns for 494 yards and a touchdown, being named fourth-team All-Big 12 by Phil Steele. He declared for the 2024 NFL draft and was invited to the NFL Scouting Combine.

== Professional career ==
Pre-draft measurables
Height	Weight	Arm length	Hand span	Wingspan	40-yard dash	10-yard split	20-yard split	20-yard shuttle	Vertical jump	Broad jump	Bench press
5 ft 8 3/8 in (1.74 m)	191 lb (87 kg)	30 5/8 in (0.78 m)	9 5/8 in (0.24 m)	6 ft 2 3/8 in (1.89 m)	4.42 s	1.51 s	2.59 s	4.30 s	33.0 in (0.84 m)	10 ft 5 in (3.18 m)	20 reps
All values from NFL Combine/Pro Day

=== Jacksonville Jaguars ===
Robinson was selected in the fifth round (167th overall) of the 2024 NFL draft by the Jacksonville Jaguars. He signed his four-year rookie contract worth $4.30 million. Robinson was placed on injured reserve on August 27, 2024 to begin the season. He was activated on November 19. Robinson played in six games and recorded two kick returns for 34 yards in a Week 14 win over the Tennessee Titans.

Robinson was released on June 4, 2025.

=== Philadelphia Eagles ===
On June 6, 2025, Robinson was claimed off waivers by the Philadelphia Eagles. He was waived on August 25.

=== New York Jets ===
On September 9, 2025, Robinson was signed to the New York Jets' practice squad. On September 18, he was placed on the practice squad injured list. On May 20, 2026, Robinson was waived.

== Career statistics ==
Legend
**Bold**	Career high

=== NFL ===
==== Regular season ====
Year	Team	Games		Kick returns				
Year	Team	GP	GS	Ret	Yds	Avg	Lng	TD
2024	JAX	6	0	2	34	17.0	20	0
Career		6	0	2	34	17.0	20	0

=== College ===
Year	Team	GP	Rushing					Receiving			Kick returns				Punt returns		
Year	Team	GP	Att	Yds	Avg	Lng	TD	Rec	Yds	TD	Ret	Yds	Avg	TD	Ret	Yds	TD
2019	Alabama	8	39	254	6.5	**74**	2	0	0	0	1	22	22.0	0	0	0	0
2021	Texas	11	**45**	**322**	7.2	65	**3**	7	57	0	0	0	0	0	0	0	0
2022	Texas	13	25	86	3.4	26	0	**20**	**219**	**3**	16	403	**25.2**	0	**1**	**19**	**1**
2023	Texas	13	12	134	**11.2**	57	**3**	8	56	0	**22**	**493**	22.5	**1**	0	0	0
Career		45	121	796	6.6	74	8	35	332	3	39	919	23.6	1	1	19	1
