= Moro Ojomo =

Nigerian-born American football player (born 2001)

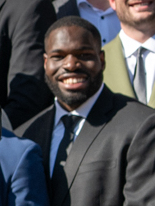
- Ojomo in 2025

No. 97 – Philadelphia Eagles
- Position: Defensive tackle
- Roster status: Active

Personal information
- Born: 15 August 2001 (age 25); Lagos, Nigeria
- Listed height: 6 ft 3 in (1.91 m)
- Listed weight: 292 lb (132 kg)

Career information
- High school: Katy (Katy, Texas, U.S.)
- College: Texas (2018–2022)
- NFL draft: 2023: 7th round, 249th overall pick

Career history
- Philadelphia Eagles (2023–present)

Awards and highlights
- Super Bowl champion (LIX); Second-team All-Big 12 (2022)

Career NFL statistics as of Week 5, 2026
- Total tackles: 75
- Pass deflections: 1
- Sacks: 6.0
- Stats at Pro Football Reference

Morotoluwa Ojomo (born 15 August 2001) is a Nigerian professional American football defensive tackle for the Philadelphia Eagles of the National Football League (NFL). A native of Lagos, he moved to the United States in 2009 and played college football for the Texas Longhorns.

== Early life ==
Ojomo was born on 15 August 2001, in Lagos, Nigeria. He began primary school at age three, and his family moved to California in 2009. His father is a pastor and his mother worked for an information technology company. While in seventh grade, his family moved again, this time to Houston, Texas. Ojomo attended Katy High School, being two years younger than most of his classmates due to having started his education at 3 in his home country. He did not play varsity football as a freshman or as a sophomore, and additionally said that he had not figured out how to workout by that time. However, following his sophomore year, he began getting serious with weight training and running, and made the varsity team as a junior, eventually earning All-District honors as a defensive lineman at the end of the year.

Ojomo became a highly-regarded recruit following his senior year, during which he led a defense that allowed under eight points-per-game, while recording eight sacks, 15 tackles-for-loss, three forced fumbles and two recoveries. He was a unanimous first-team All-District selection, was named the defensive most valuable player of the district, and was named second-team all-state. 247Sports ranked him one of the top-300 recruits nationally, as well as the 36th-best in Texas, and the 25th-best defensive tackle overall. Ojomo was a three-star recruit and received numerous Division I offers, including from Notre Dame, Oregon, Tennessee, Texas A&M, Oklahoma, Alabama and Miami, among others. He eventually accepted an offer from Texas.

== College career ==
Ojomo was only 16 when he enrolled at Texas, and as a true freshman redshirted while appearing in three late-season games, including the conference championship game. He saw his first time as a starter in the 2019 season, appearing in all 13 games with two starts, and posted 13 tackles, including 2.5 for a loss, and one fumble recovery. The following year, in a season shortened by COVID-19, Ojomo became a full-time starter and made 21 tackles, 2.5 tackles-for-loss, two sacks, three quarterback hurries, and one pass breakup.

Ojomo remained a starter during the 2021 season and, despite being under a new coaching staff, earned honorable mention All-Big 12 Conference after recording 29 tackles, three of which were for a loss, in addition to three quarterback hits and one pass breakup. As a fifth-year senior in 2022, he recorded career-highs with 32 tackles, 5.5 for a loss, and three sacks. Although given one remaining year of eligibility, Ojomo opted to declare for the 2023 NFL draft and thus finished his five-season stint at Texas with 50 total games played, 95 tackles and five sacks.

== Professional career ==
Pre-draft measurables
Height	Weight	Arm length	Hand span	Wingspan	40-yard dash	10-yard split	20-yard split	20-yard shuttle	Three-cone drill	Vertical jump	Broad jump	Bench press
6 ft 2 5/8 in (1.90 m)	292 lb (132 kg)	34 1/2 in (0.88 m)	10 3/8 in (0.26 m)	6 ft 11 3/8 in (2.12 m)	5.04 s	1.77 s	2.88 s	4.60 s	7.45 s	33.0 in (0.84 m)	9 ft 4 in (2.84 m)	29 reps
All values from NFL Combine/Pro Day

Ojomo was one of five Texas players to be invited to the 2023 NFL Combine. He was selected by the Philadelphia Eagles in the seventh round (249th overall) of the 2023 NFL Draft. He signed his rookie contract on 4 May. During Week 17, Ojomo recorded his first NFL career tackle against the Arizona Cardinals. He appeared in eight games.

In the 2024 season, Ojomo appeared in 17 games and made one start. He recorded a sack in the Divisional Round win over the Rams. He had two tackles, including one for loss, in Super Bowl LIX, a 40–22 win over the Kansas City Chiefs. In the 2025 season, he finished with six sacks, 38 total tackles, and one pass defended.

== Career statistics ==
Legend
**Bold**	Career high

=== NFL ===
==== Regular season ====
Year	Team	Games		Tackles					Interceptions				Fumbles			
Year	Team	GP	GS	Cmb	Solo	Ast	Sck	TFL	PD	Int	Yds	TD	FF	FR	Yds	TD
2023	PHI	8	0	3	2	1	0.0	0	0	0	0	0	0	0	0	0
2024	PHI	17	1	20	6	14	0.0	0	0	0	0	0	0	0	0	0
2025	PHI	17	9	**38**	**17**	**21**	**6.0**	**6**	**1**	0	0	0	0	0	0	0
Career		42	10	61	25	36	6.0	6	1	0	0	0	0	0	0	0

===== Postseason =====
Year	Team	Games		Tackles					Interceptions				Fumbles			
Year	Team	GP	GS	Cmb	Solo	Ast	Sck	TFL	PD	Int	Yds	TD	FF	FR	Yds	TD
2024	PHI	4	0	**7**	**5**	**2**	**1.0**	**2**	0	0	0	0	0	0	0	0
2025	PHI	1	0	2	2	0	0.0	0	0	0	0	0	0	0	0	0
Career		5	0	9	7	2	1.0	2	0	0	0	0	0	0	0	0

=== College ===
Year	Team	GP	Tackles					Interceptions					Fumbles			
Year	Team	GP	Solo	Ast	Cmb	TfL	Sck	Int	Yds	Avg	TD	PD	FR	Yds	TD	FF
2018	Texas	3	0	0	0	0.0	0.0	0	0	0.0	0	0	0	0	0	0
2019	Texas	13	7	6	13	2.5	0.0	0	0	0.0	0	0	1	0	0	0
2020	Texas	10	10	11	21	2.5	2.0	0	0	0.0	0	1	0	0	0	0
2021	Texas	12	17	12	29	3.0	0.0	0	0	0.0	0	1	0	0	0	0
2022	Texas	12	16	16	32	5.5	3.0	0	0	0.0	0	0	0	0	0	0
Career		50	50	45	95	13.5	5.0	0	0	0.0	0	2	1	0	0	0
