= Ovie Oghoufo =

American football player (born 2000)

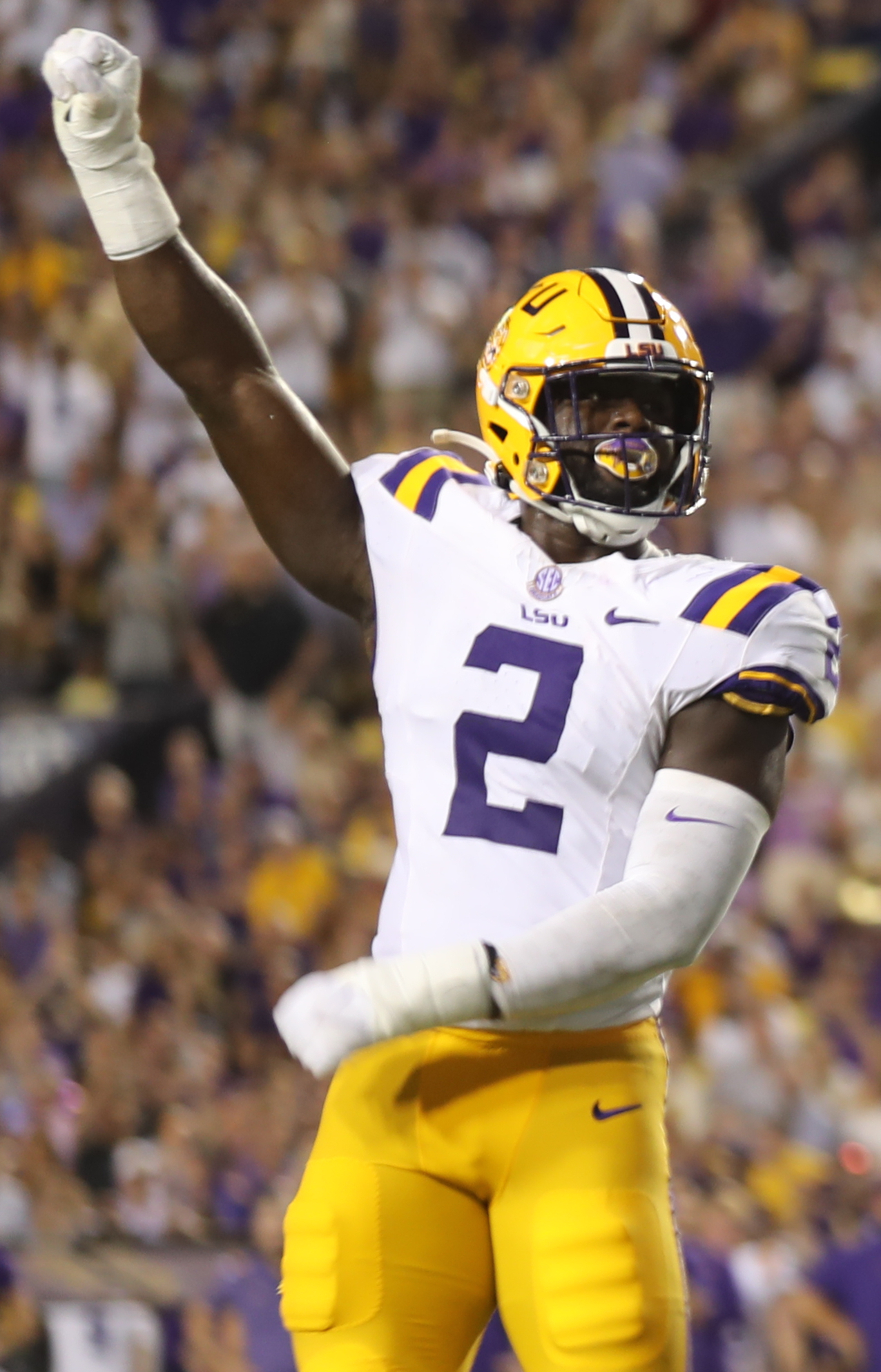
- Oghoufo in 2023

Profile
- Position: Defensive end

Personal information
- Born: March 27, 2000 (age 26); Farmington Hills, Michigan, U.S.
- Listed height: 6 ft 4 in (1.93 m)
- Listed weight: 250 lb (113 kg)

Career information
- High school: Harrison (Farmington Hills, Michigan)
- College: Notre Dame (2018–2020); Texas (2021–2022); LSU (2023)
- NFL draft: 2024: undrafted

Career history
- New York Giants (2024)*; Las Vegas Raiders (2024)*
- * Offseason or practice squad member only
- Stats at Pro Football Reference

Ovie Peace Oghoufo (born March 27, 2000) is an American professional football defensive end. He played college football for the Notre Dame Fighting Irish, Texas Longhorns, and LSU Tigers before being signed by the Giants as an undrafted free agent.

== Early life ==
Oghoufo attended high school at Harrison in Farmington Hills, Michigan. During Oghoufo's sophomore season, he tallied 66 tackles with 19 being for a loss, eight sacks, and three forced fumbles. In Oghoufo's first game as he senior, he totaled ten tackles as well as bringing in five receptions for 59 yards. In Oghoufo's senior season, he made 32 receptions for 508 yards and five TDs while also having 56 tackles and seven sacks. Coming out of high school, Oghoufo held offers from schools such as Notre Dame, Michigan, Michigan State, Boston College, and Kentucky. Oghoufo ultimately decided to commit to play for the Notre Dame Fighting Irish.

== College career ==
=== Notre Dame ===
In the 2019 season, Oghoufo totaled 12 tackles with two and a half being for a loss, a sack, and a pass deflection. In 2020, Oghoufo would total ten tackles with two and a half being for a loss, and a sack and a half. After the conclusion of the 2021 season, Oghoufo decided to enter the NCAA transfer portal.

=== Texas ===
Oghoufo decided to transfer to play for the Texas Longhorns. During the 2021 season, Oghoufo tallied 42 tackles with five and a half going for a loss, and two sacks. In week four of the 2022 season, Oghoufo had six tackles, and forced a fumble but the Longhorns would fall to Texas Tech. In 2022, Oghoufo notched 50 tackles with eight and a half being for a loss, two and a half sacks, and a forced fumble. After the conclusion of the 2022 season, Oghoufo decided to enter the NCAA transfer portal.

In Oghoufo's career with Texas, he started 20 games where he made 96 tackles with 14 being for a loss, and four and a half sacks.

=== LSU ===
Oghoufo decided to transfer to play for the LSU Tigers.

== Professional career ==
Pre-draft measurables
Height	Weight	Arm length	Hand span	40-yard dash	10-yard split	20-yard split	20-yard shuttle	Three-cone drill	Vertical jump	Broad jump	Bench press
6 ft 2 7/8 in (1.90 m)	248 lb (112 kg)	33 3/4 in (0.86 m)	9 3/4 in (0.25 m)	4.65 s	1.68 s	2.78 s	4.48 s	7.14 s	34.0 in (0.86 m)	9 ft 11 in (3.02 m)	20 reps
All values from Pro Day

=== New York Giants ===
Oghoufo signed with the New York Giants as an undrafted free agent on May 10, 2024. He was waived/injured on August 27.

=== Las Vegas Raiders ===
On December 18, 2024, Oghoufo was signed to the Las Vegas Raiders practice squad. He signed a reserve/future contract on January 6, 2025.

On August 26, 2025, Oghoufo was waived by the Raiders as part of final roster cuts.
