= Josh Thompson (defensive back) =

American football player (born 1998)

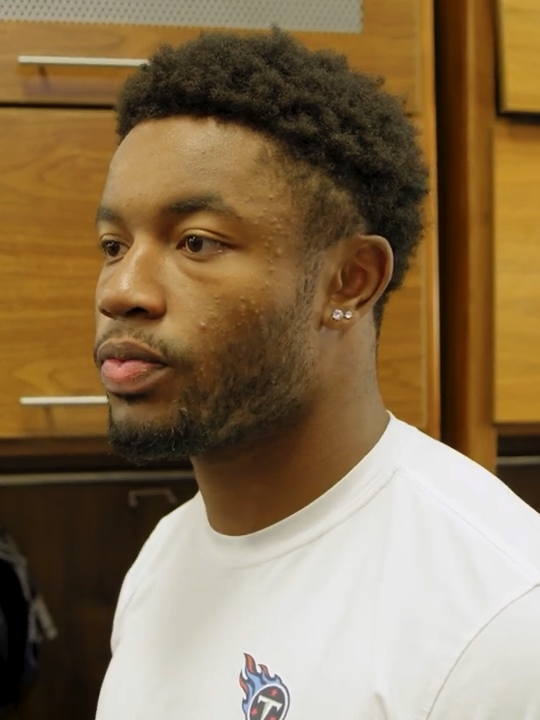
- Thompson in 2022

Profile
- Position: Safety

Personal information
- Born: October 20, 1998 (age 28); Nacogdoches, Texas, U.S.
- Listed height: 6 ft 0 in (1.83 m)
- Listed weight: 194 lb (88 kg)

Career information
- High school: Nacogdoches
- College: Texas
- NFL draft: 2022: undrafted

Career history
- Jacksonville Jaguars (2022)*; Tennessee Titans (2022–2023); Houston Texans (2024)*; Atlanta Falcons (2024–2025)*; Columbus Aviators (2026)*
- * Offseason or practice squad member only

Career NFL statistics as of 2023
- Total tackles: 4
- Stats at Pro Football Reference

Josh Thompson (born October 20, 1998) is an American professional football safety. He previously played for the Tennessee Titans of the National Football League (NFL). He played college football at Texas.

== Early life ==
Thompson attended Nacogdoches High School in Nacogdoches, Texas. A four-star recruit, he committed to Texas to play college football on July 27, 2016. He chose Texas over, among others, Baylor, Kansas State, Minnesota, Mississippi, Missouri, Penn State, and UCLA.

== College career ==
Thompson played at Texas from 2017 to 2021. During his career he had 108 tackles (79 solo), five tackles for loss, two interceptions, one fumble recovery, one touchdown, and seven pass break-ups in 37 games.

== Professional career ==
Pre-draft measurables
Height	Weight	Arm length	Hand span	Wingspan	40-yard dash	10-yard split	20-yard split	20-yard shuttle	Three-cone drill	Vertical jump	Broad jump	Bench press
5 ft 11 1/2 in (1.82 m)	194 lb (88 kg)	30 7/8 in (0.78 m)	9 3/8 in (0.24 m)	6 ft 2 7/8 in (1.90 m)	4.40 s	1.55 s	2.58 s	4.13 s	6.84 s	37.5 in (0.95 m)	10 ft 7 in (3.23 m)	15 reps
All values from NFL Combine and Texas's Pro Day

=== Jacksonville Jaguars ===
On May 2, 2022, Thompson signed with the Jacksonville Jaguars as an undrafted free agent following the 2022 NFL draft. On August 30, 2022, after the final roster cutdown of the preseason, Thompson made the 53-man roster for the 2022 season, but was waived the next day and re-signed to the practice squad.

=== Tennessee Titans ===
On October 17, 2022, Thompson was signed by the Tennessee Titans off the Jaguars practice squad. He was placed on injured reserve on November 12, 2022. He was activated on December 10.

On July 23, 2023, Thompson was placed on the active/non-football injury list. He was activated from the active/non-football injury list on August 14, 2023. He was waived on August 28. He was re-signed to the practice squad on November 7. He was not signed to a reserve/future contract and thus became a free agent when his contract expired at the end of the season.

=== Houston Texans ===
On January 25, 2024, Thompson signed a reserve/future contract with the Houston Texans. He was waived on April 9.

=== Atlanta Falcons ===
On August 12, 2024, Thompson signed with the Atlanta Falcons. He was waived/injured on August 27.

On June 2, 2025, Thompson re-signed with the Falcons. He was waived on August 23.

=== Columbus Aviators ===
On January 14, 2026, Thompson was drafted by the Columbus Aviators in Day 2 of the 2026 UFL Draft. He was released on February 16.
