= Hayden Conner =

American football player (born 2002)

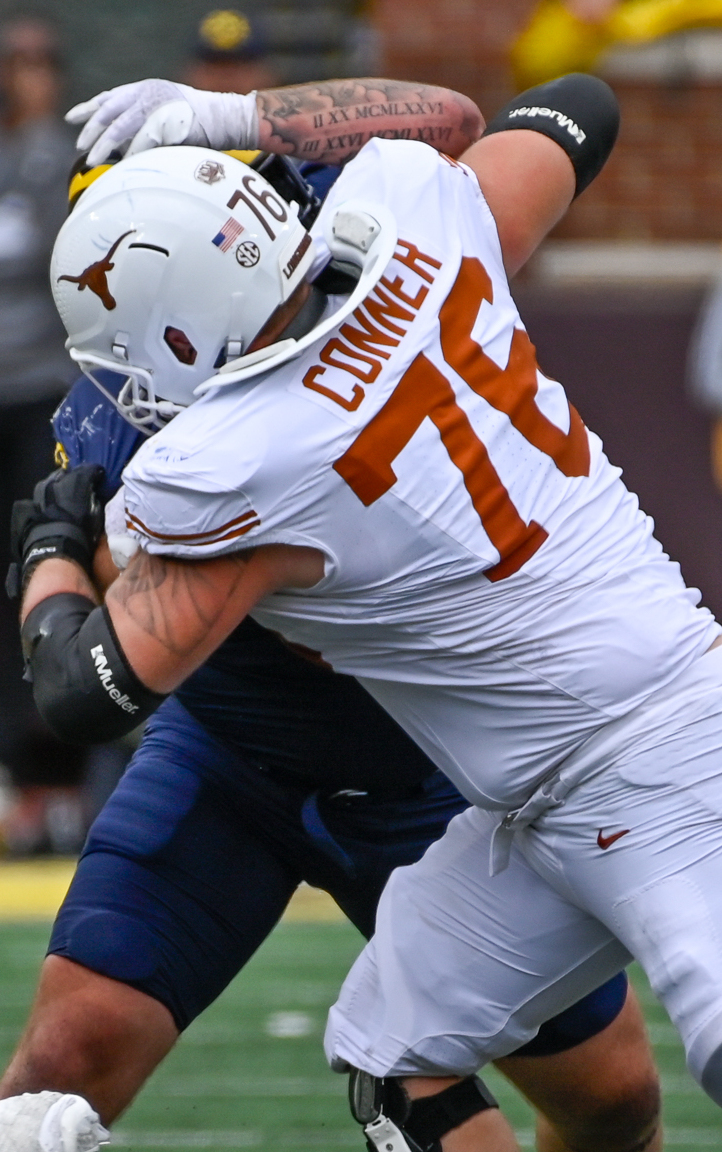
- Conner with the Texas Longhorns in 2024

No. 58 – Arizona Cardinals
- Position: Guard
- Roster status: Active

Personal information
- Born: April 26, 2002 (age 24); Katy, Texas, U.S.
- Listed height: 6 ft 6 in (1.98 m)
- Listed weight: 315 lb (143 kg)

Career information
- High school: James E. Taylor (Katy)
- College: Texas (2021–2024)
- NFL draft: 2025: 6th round, 211th overall pick

Career history
- Arizona Cardinals (2025–present)

Career NFL statistics as of Week 9, 2026
- Games played: 14
- Games started: 2
- Stats at Pro Football Reference

Hayden Conner (born April 26, 2002) is an American professional football guard for the Arizona Cardinals of the National Football League (NFL). He played college football for the Texas Longhorns and was selected by the Cardinals in the sixth round of the 2025 NFL draft.

== Early life ==
Conner was playing football already in the 7th grade, benefiting from large stature and weight. Conner attended James E. Taylor High School in Harris County, Texas, and was rated as a four-star recruit in the class of 2021 before committing to play college football for the Texas Longhorns.

== College career ==
As a freshman in 2021, Conner appeared in eight games for the Longhorns. He took over a starting guard position, where he started for all of the 2022 and 2023 seasons for Texas. During the 2024 season, Conner was named to the 2024 Allstate AFCA Good Works Team and was a Wuerffel Trophy semifinalist for his support of animal shelters in the Austin area, as well as a number of other volunteer efforts. After the season, he declared for the 2025 NFL draft. During his time as a Longhorn, Conner appeared in 51 games for Texas with 43 starts.

== Professional career ==
Pre-draft measurables
Height	Weight	Arm length	Hand span	Wingspan	40-yard dash	10-yard split	20-yard split	20-yard shuttle	Three-cone drill	Vertical jump	Broad jump
6 ft 6 in (1.98 m)	314 lb (142 kg)	33 1/4 in (0.84 m)	9 5/8 in (0.24 m)	6 ft 7 5/8 in (2.02 m)	5.23 s	1.75 s	3.01 s	4.72 s	7.64 s	25.5 in (0.65 m)	8 ft 5 in (2.57 m)
All values from NFL Combine/Pro Day

Conner was selected by the Arizona Cardinals with the 211th overall pick in the sixth round of the 2025 NFL draft. Conner signed his four-year rookie contract worth $4.37 million. He was placed on injured reserve on August 26, 2025. Conner was activated on November 29, ahead of the team's Week 13 matchup against the Tampa Bay Buccaneers. He made his NFL debut in Week 13, playing four snaps on special teams.

In Week 7 of the 2026 season, Conner made his first career start.
