= Anthony Cook (defensive back) =

American football player (born 2000)

Profile
- Position: Safety

Personal information
- Born: June 20, 2000 (age 26); Houston, Texas, U.S.
- Listed height: 6 ft 1 in (1.85 m)
- Listed weight: 188 lb (85 kg)

Career information
- High school: Lamar (Houston, Texas)
- College: Texas (2018-2022)
- NFL draft: 2023: undrafted

Career history
- Kansas City Chiefs (2023)*; Calgary Stampeders (2025)*
- * Offseason or practice squad member only

Awards and highlights
- 2022 Alamo Bowl Sportsmanship Award; 2019 Sugar Bowl Champion; Alamo Bowl Champion (2019, 2020)
- Stats at CFL.ca

Anthony Cook (born June 20, 2000) is an American professional football safety. He played college football at Texas and then went to training camp for the Kansas City Chiefs as an undrafted free agent in 2023 and the Calgary Stampeders of the Canadian Football League (CFL) in 2025.

== Early life ==
Cook was born and raised in Houston where he played high school football at Houston Lamar. He was a first-team all district in 2015, 2016 and 2017 and a High School All-American. In 2016 he was Second Team All-USA Texas. In 2017 he had 2 tackles (two for loss) and six pass breakups. He was a top recruit with offers from Ohio State, Alabama, and LSU, but he chose to go to Texas December 2017. In 2017 he was an ALL-USA Texas Football Team first-team selection.

After High School, he participated in the 2018 U.S. Army All-American Bowl.

== College career ==
Cook played college football at Texas, where his cousin Eric Cuffee had played, from 2018 to 2022.

In 2018 he played in all 14 of the Longhorn's games, recording 13 tackles and a sack. He helped the team reach the Big 12 Championship game, which he played in, and win the 2019 Sugar Bowl.

In 2019, he played in 11 games, had 24 tackles including one for a loss, 2 pass deflections and a forced fumble. He helped the Longhorns win the 2019 Alamo Bowl and finish ranked #25.

In 2020, he played in 10 games and had 18 tackles, including 2 for a loss. He again helped the Longhorns reach and win the Alamo Bowl and finish ranked #19.

Heading into the 2020 season, Cook announced via Twitter that he was leaving the program, but then he quickly deleted it and the issue seemed to be resolved. A few weeks later, days before Texas opened preseason practice, Cook removed his name from the transfer database.

After struggling to find a place in the program, Cook thrived under new defensive coordinator Pete Kwiatkowski where he was moved from cornerback to "Star" - the nickle-back in Kwiatkowski's defense - and became a regular starter. He co-led the team in pass breakups (with Jahdae Barron, T'Vondre Sweat and Jerrin Thompson) and was an All-Big 12 Honorable Mention. He played in 12 games, recording 46 tackles, including 3 for a loss and 3 deflected pass, He also recorded a sack, forced fumble and recovered fumble on the same play against TCU. The Longhorns failed to qualify for a bowl game that year.

Taking advantage of the NCAA legislation that returned a year of eligibility to student-athletes whose seasons were curtailed or canceled because of the worldwide coronavirus pandemic, Cook had a 5th year in 2022, during which he repeated as an All-Big 12 Honorable Mention, despite suffering a broken arm in the second quarter of the Oklahoma State game, which led to an early departure from that game and limited playing time in the next. He played in 13 games, recorded 61 tackles, including 4 for a loss, 0.5 sacks, 5 deflected passes, and a forced fumble. Against Iowa State, he forced a fumble on the Cyclones’ final play that clinched a victory for Texas. He helped the Longhorn reach the Alamo Bowl for the 3rd time in four years and received the game's Fred Jacoby Sportsmanship Award.

He was also a two-time member of the Big 12 Commissioner’s Honor Roll (spring 2020, spring 2021).

After his college career was over, he played in the 2003 Hula Bowl where he recorded 2 assisted tackles and half a TFL for the winning Kai team.

== Professional career ==
Pre-draft measurables
Height	Weight	Arm length	Hand span	40-yard dash	10-yard split	20-yard split	20-yard shuttle	Three-cone drill	Vertical jump	Broad jump	Bench press
6 ft 0 1/8 in (1.83 m)	188 lb (85 kg)	31 1/8 in (0.79 m)	8 3/4 in (0.22 m)	4.63 s	1.57 s	2.59 s	4.31 s	6.97 s	34.0 in (0.86 m)	10 ft 5 in (3.18 m)	12 reps
All values from Pro Day

=== Kansas City Chiefs ===
On May 6, 2023, the Kansas City Chiefs signed Cook to a three-year, $2.70 million contract as an undrafted free agent. He was released on August 29.

=== Calgary Stampeders ===
On February 3, 2025, Cook signed with the Calgary Stampeders of the Canadian Football League (CFL). He was cut on May 10, 2025 as the Stampede reduced their roster to 85 players.
