= Jahdae Barron =

American football player (born 2001)

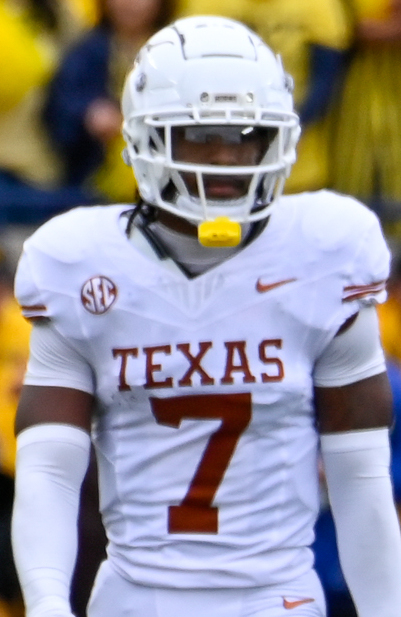
- Barron with the Texas Longhorns in 2024

No. 23 – Denver Broncos
- Position: Cornerback
- Roster status: Active

Personal information
- Born: December 4, 2001 (age 24); Corpus Christi, Texas, U.S.
- Listed height: 5 ft 11 in (1.80 m)
- Listed weight: 200 lb (91 kg)

Career information
- High school: Connally (Austin, Texas)
- College: Texas (2020–2024)
- NFL draft: 2025: 1st round, 20th overall pick

Career history
- Denver Broncos (2025–present)

Awards and highlights
- Jim Thorpe Award (2024); Consensus All-American (2024); First-team All-SEC (2024); Second-team All-Big 12 (2023)

Career NFL statistics as of Week 6, 2026
- Tackles: 56
- Fumble recoveries: 1
- Pass deflections: 6
- Interceptions: 1
- Stats at Pro Football Reference

Jahdae Lyzel Barron (/ʒɑːˈdeɪ/ zhah-DAY; born December 4, 2001) is an American professional football cornerback for the Denver Broncos of the National Football League (NFL). Barron played college football for the Texas Longhorns, winning the 2024 Jim Thorpe Award. He was selected by the Broncos in the first round of the 2025 NFL draft.

== Early life ==
Barron was born on December 4, 2001, in Corpus Christi, Texas, later moving to the Austin area when he was in elementary school. Barron attended John B. Connally High School in Austin, Texas. He played cornerback and wide receiver in high school. As a senior, he had 41 receptions for 673 yards and six touchdowns on offense and 43 tackles and three interceptions on defense. A four star prospect, he originally committed to play college football at Texas Christian University (TCU) and Baylor University before ultimately choosing the University of Texas at Austin.

== College career ==
Barron played in five games and had three tackles as a true freshman at Texas in 2020. As a sophomore in 2021, he started two of nine games, recording 18 tackles. As a junior in 2022, he started nine of 13 games, finishing with 78 tackles, one sack, two interceptions with one of the interceptions returned for a touchdown. Barron returned to Texas in 2023. During the season, he started 12 of 14 games, recording 61 tackles, one interception, seven pass breakups and one fumble recovery. Barron announced that he would return for the 2024 season. As a senior in 2024 Barron won the Jim Thorpe Award as the nation's top defensive back and was a consensus All-American.

== Professional career ==
Pre-draft measurables
Height	Weight	Arm length	Hand span	Wingspan	40-yard dash	10-yard split	20-yard split	20-yard shuttle	Three-cone drill	Vertical jump	Broad jump
5 ft 10 3/4 in (1.80 m)	194 lb (88 kg)	29 5/8 in (0.75 m)	9 1/2 in (0.24 m)	6 ft 1 1/2 in (1.87 m)	4.39 s	1.50 s	2.56 s	4.19 s	7.05 s	35.0 in (0.89 m)	10 ft 3 in (3.12 m)
All values from NFL Combine/Pro Day

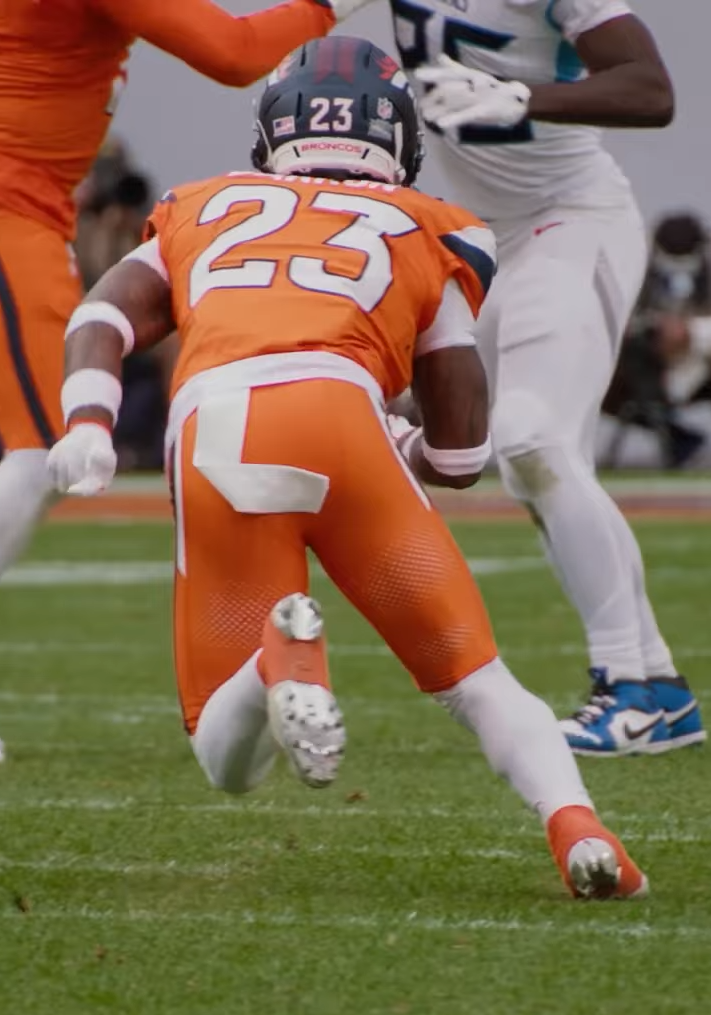
Barron in 2025

Barron was selected by the Denver Broncos in the first round (20th overall) of the 2025 NFL draft. Upon being drafted, Barron requested to speak to the Broncos' draft room to personally thank every person there for choosing him. Barron signed his four-year rookie contract, worth $18.07 million fully guaranteed, on July 15, 2025. Initially wearing #12, Barron switched to #23 after the Broncos cut Audric Estimé prior to the beginning of the season. He had worn the number for his first four years in college to honor Tardrick Fowler Jr., a deceased family friend.

Barron made his NFL debut in Week 1 against the Tennessee Titans. In the game, Barron recorded one tackle and one fumble recovery that sealed the win for the Broncos 20–12. In Week 8 against the Dallas Cowboys, he recorded his first NFL career interception.

== Career statistics ==
=== NFL ===
Legend
**Bold**	Career high

==== Regular season ====
Year	Team	Games		Tackles					Interceptions				Fumbles			
Year	Team	GP	GS	Cmb	Solo	Ast	Sck	TFL	PD	Int	Yds	TD	FF	FR	Yds	TD
2025	DEN	17	5	35	24	11	0.0	0	5	1	0	0	0	1	0	0
2026	DEN	6	2	21	17	4	0.0	1	1	0	0	0	0	0	0	0
Career		23	7	56	41	15	0.0	1	6	1	0	0	0	1	0	0

==== Postseason ====
Year	Team	Games		Tackles					Interceptions				Fumbles			
Year	Team	GP	GS	Cmb	Solo	Ast	Sck	TFL	PD	Int	Yds	TD	FF	FR	Yds	TD
2025	DEN	2	0	1	0	1	0.0	0	0	0	0	0	0	0	0	0
Career		2	0	1	0	1	0.0	0	0	0	0	0	0	0	0	0

=== College ===
Year	Team	GP	Tackles					Interceptions					Fumbles			
Year	Team	GP	Solo	Ast	Cmb	TfL	Sck	Int	Yds	Avg	TD	PD	FR	Yds	TD	FF
2020	Texas	5	3	0	3	0	0.0	0	0	0.0	0	1	0	0	0	0
2021	Texas	9	12	6	18	1	0.0	0	0	0.0	0	3	0	0	0	**1**
2022	Texas	13	43	**35**	**78**	**12**	**1.0**	2	50	**25.0**	**1**	3	**1**	**48**	**1**	0
2023	Texas	14	32	28	60	5	0.0	1	16	16.0	0	6	**1**	0	0	0
2024	Texas	**16**	**46**	21	67	3	**1.0**	**5**	**82**	16.4	0	**11**	**1**	2	0	0
Career		57	136	90	226	21	2.0	8	148	18.5	1	24	3	50	1	1

== Personal life ==
Barron has a very close relationship with his mother, Techonia Davis, stating that one of the goals of his football career is to make enough money for her to retire. He has two older brothers and three younger sisters.

Since childhood, Barron has been friends with fellow cornerback Sean Fresch after growing up together in Austin.
